= Mathematical analysis =

Branch of mathematics

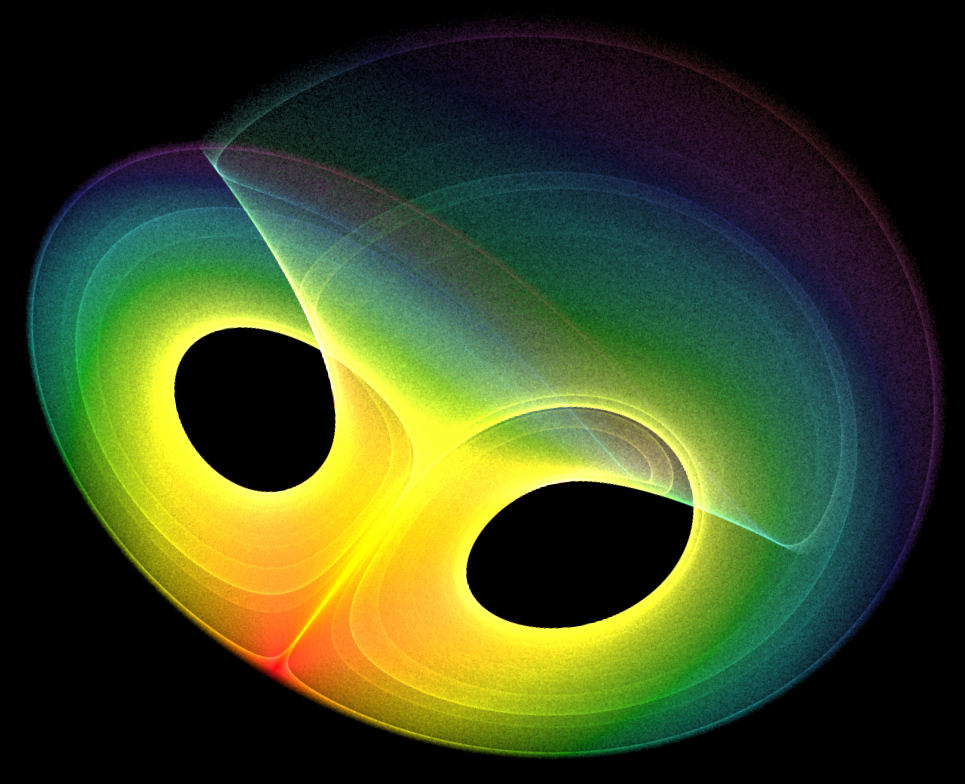
A strange attractor arising from a differential equation. Differential equations are an important area of mathematical analysis with many applications in science and engineering.

Mathematical analysis is the branch of mathematics that studies functions, spaces, and operators through methods of approximation and convergence. It grew out of calculus, especially the use of derivatives and integrals to study variable quantities, and in the 19th century its foundations were reformulated with greater rigor. Basic objects of study in mathematical analysis include the real numbers, functions, sequences, series, and limits. Analysis is closely connected with applications in the sciences, providing methods for formulating and analyzing mathematical models, constructing approximations, and estimating their errors.

Typical analytical questions concern how functions, sequences, and operators behave under limiting processes and perturbations: convergence and continuity, regularity and stability, quantitative bounds, and the accuracy of approximations. Modern analysis studies these questions in many settings, including Euclidean spaces, metric spaces, topological spaces, measure spaces, function spaces, and manifolds. Its major areas include real analysis, complex analysis, functional analysis, measure theory, harmonic analysis, and the theory of ordinary and partial differential equations.

== History ==
Archimedes used the method of exhaustion to compute the area inside a circle by finding the area of regular polygons with more and more sides. This was an early but informal example of a limit, one of the most basic concepts in mathematical analysis.

=== Ancient ===
Mathematical analysis formally developed in the 17th century during the Scientific Revolution, but many of its ideas can be traced back to earlier mathematicians. Early results in analysis were implicitly present in the early days of ancient Greek mathematics. For instance, an infinite geometric sum is implicit in Zeno's paradox of the dichotomy. (Strictly speaking, the point of the paradox is to deny that the infinite sum exists.) Later, Greek mathematicians such as Eudoxus and Archimedes made more explicit, but informal, use of the concepts of limits and convergence when they used the method of exhaustion to compute the area and volume of regions and solids. The explicit use of infinitesimals appears in Archimedes' The Method of Mechanical Theorems, a work rediscovered in the 20th century. In Asia, the Chinese mathematician Liu Hui used the method of exhaustion in the 3rd century CE to find the area of a circle. From Jain literature, it appears that Hindus were in possession of the formulae for the sum of the arithmetic and geometric series as early as the 4th century BCE. Ācārya Bhadrabāhu uses the sum of a geometric series in his Kalpasūtra in 433 BCE.

=== Medieval ===
During the medieval period, mathematicians in several traditions developed methods that anticipated later topics in analysis, including quadrature, infinite series, infinitesimal reasoning, approximation, and the mathematical study of motion. In the Islamic world, Ibn al-Haytham worked on sums of powers and area problems, and Ibrahim ibn Sinan generalized Archimedean methods in the quadrature of the parabola. In medieval Europe, the Oxford Calculators studied uniformly accelerated motion, and Nicole Oresme gave a graphical proof of the mean speed theorem, representing displacement by the area under a velocity-time graph. Oresme also used infinite series and proved the divergence of the harmonic series. In India, Bhāskara II used infinitesimal reasoning and stated results related to what is now called Rolle's theorem, and the Kerala school of astronomy and mathematics, especially Madhava, developed infinite series for trigonometric functions. These developments were not mathematical analysis in the modern sense, but were important precursors to calculus and analysis.

Questions of the nature of the continuum were important to medieval European philosophers. In particular, whether the continuum could be infinitely divided, whether it consisted of points. The works of Aristotle, which only became more widely available in Europe in the earth 13th century, held that the continuum was not made of points: if it were, the points would have to be side-by-side which would be incompatible with the inseparability of the continuum. In the 14th century, Thomas Bradwardine described the continuum as being made of an infinite collection of infinitesimals in Tractatus de continuo, but not of points. William of Occam held, contrarily, that the continuum is made of actual points. Aristotle had also written on the nature of infinity, classifying two different kinds of infinity: potential infinity and actual infinity. For medieval European philosophers, the nature of infinity posed problems for the ideas of infinite divisibility and infinitesimals, because if a subdivision of a continuum was infinitesimal, its ratio to the whole continuum would need to be infinite, and various paradoxes would result. Richard Swineshead in Liber calculationum wrote that such ratios should simply be left undefined, and that the arguments about infinity do not proceed as arguments about finite quantities. These are some of the earliest seeds in the European tradition in which Leibniz's views on the continuum would emerge some three centuries years later, with Leibniz explicitly crediting Swineshead.

=== Renaissance ===
In the early seventeenth century, methods that anticipated the calculus became increasingly systematic. Johannes Kepler used infinitesimal and summation arguments in problems of area and volume, Galileo Galilei connected mathematics with the study of motion, Bonaventura Cavalieri developed the method of indivisibles, and Evangelista Torricelli extended such methods in geometry and mechanics. These works did not yet constitute mathematical analysis in the modern sense, but they helped shift the subject from classical geometric constructions toward general methods for treating continuous quantities, tangents, areas, volumes, and motion. The subsequent development of differential and integral calculus by Newton and Leibniz became the starting point for much of later analysis.

=== Modern ===
==== Origins ====
In 17th century Europe, new methods for geometry and mathematical physics laid the groundwork for mathematical analysis. Descartes's La Géométrie (1637), together with Fermat's related work, introduced algebraic methods into the study of curves and established the foundations of analytic geometry. Fermat's method of adequality allowed him to determine tangents of curves and their the maxima and minima. Shortly thereafter, Wallis published Arithmetica Infinitorum, which extended ideas of Cavalieri on quadrature and the method of indivisibles. Newton published some of his earliest mathematical works amid this milieu, and was focused on power series. At the same time, motivation from physics, exemplified by the discoveries of Kepler and Galileo, called for more general constructions than the classical constructions of particular figures.

The culminating work of Newton and Leibniz in the later 17th century gave these strands a new and more general form. The differential and integral calculi made change, tangent problems, quadrature, and inverse tangent problems parts of a common method. Their independent work is commonly treated as the emergence of infinitesimal analysis as a distinct mathematical discipline. Physics was profoundly influenced by the new mathematics. For example, Newton's second law of motion could assume a quantitative form: that the force was related to a second derivative.

During the eighteenth century, mathematicians extended these methods and increasingly reconceived analysis in terms of algebraic relations and functions rather than solely geometric quantities. Euler gave the concept of function a central role, while Lagrange and others developed methods involving power series, differential equations, and the calculus of variations.

==== Modernization ====
In the 18th century, Euler introduced the notion of a mathematical function. Real analysis began to emerge as an independent subject when Bernard Bolzano introduced the modern definition of continuity in 1816, but Bolzano's work did not become widely known until the 1870s. In 1821, Cauchy began to put calculus on a firm logical foundation by rejecting the principle of the generality of algebra widely used in earlier work, particularly by Euler. Instead, Cauchy formulated calculus in terms of geometric ideas and infinitesimals. Thus, his definition of continuity required an infinitesimal change in x to correspond to an infinitesimal change in y. He also introduced the concept of the Cauchy sequence, and started the formal theory of complex analysis. Poisson, Liouville, Fourier and others studied partial differential equations and harmonic analysis. The contributions of these mathematicians and others, such as Weierstrass, developed the (ε, δ)-definition of limit approach, thus founding the modern field of mathematical analysis. Around the same time, Riemann introduced his theory of integration, and made significant advances in complex analysis.

Towards the end of the 19th century, mathematicians started worrying that they were assuming the existence of a continuum of real numbers without proof. Dedekind then constructed the real numbers by Dedekind cuts, in which irrational numbers are formally defined, which serve to fill the "gaps" between rational numbers, thereby creating a complete set: the continuum of real numbers, which had already been developed by Simon Stevin in terms of decimal expansions. Around that time, the attempts to refine the theorems of Riemann integration led to the study of the "size" of the set of discontinuities of real functions.

Also, various pathological objects, (such as nowhere continuous functions, continuous but nowhere differentiable functions, and space-filling curves), commonly known as "monsters", began to be investigated. In this context, Jordan developed his theory of measure, Cantor developed what is now called naive set theory, and Baire proved the Baire category theorem. In the early 20th century, calculus was formalized using an axiomatic set theory. Lebesgue greatly improved measure theory, and introduced his own theory of integration, now known as Lebesgue integration, which proved to be a big improvement over Riemann's. Hilbert introduced Hilbert spaces to solve integral equations. The idea of normed vector space was in the air, and in the 1920s Banach created functional analysis.

== Key concepts ==
Analysis studies functions and their generalizations by methods involving limits. As the subject developed, these methods were extended to more complicated objects, including functionals and operators.

=== Real numbers ===
The real numbers provide the standard setting for much of classical analysis. Their completeness, often expressed by the least-upper-bound property, underlies basic results about limits, continuity, differentiation, and integration.

=== Approximation and convergence ===
Approximation plays a fundamental role in many areas of mathematics. An example is the limit of a sequence of real numbers: the terms of a convergent sequence of real numbers approximate its limit with arbitrarily small error. A concrete example is the approximation of the fraction $1/3$ by the sequence of decimal values $0.3,0.33,0.333,$ etc. Given any error tolerance, all except finitely many terms of the sequence approximate $1/3$ to within that error. A sequence of real numbers is a family $a_{1}, a_{2}\ldots$ of real numbers, each indexed by a natural number. A sequence is said to converge to a limit $L$ if, for any positive error tolerance $\epsilon$, all of the members of the sequence are within $\epsilon$ of $L$ except possibly for finitely many members of the sequence. Formally, for any error $\epsilon > 0$ there is an integer $N$ such that
$$|a_n-L|<\epsilon$$
whenever $n>N$.

This example shows the use of approximation: the elements $a_n$ approximate the number $L$, and the error tolerance is $\epsilon$. However, convergence by itself does not give an explicit bound on the error at a given index, and many results in analysis concern such bounds.

Another example comes from differential calculus. A real function $f$ is differentiable at a point $a$ if there is a linear function $L(x) = f(a) + f'(a)(x-a)$ that approximates the function well near the point $x=a$; the derivative $f'(a)$ is then the slope of this linear approximation. But "well" here only means that the approximation error
$$|f(x) - L(x)| = o(x-a)$$
where $o(x-a)$ is a function that tends to zero faster than $x-a$ as $x\to a$. Stronger hypotheses on $f$ allow more precise bounds on the error in this approximation. Taylor's theorem, for example, states that for a twice continuously-differentiable function on a closed interval containing $a$
$$|f(x) - L(x)| \le M (x-a)^2$$
where $M$ can be estimated explicitly using the second derivative. This allows the error in the linear approximation to be bounded much more precisely than differentiability at the point.

The inequality $|f(x)-L(x)| \le M(x-a)^2$ is an example of what is called an estimate in analysis. Estimates are inequalities that bound the size of one quantity in terms of others. They are used to quantify approximation errors and, more generally, to control the behavior of functions and operators.

Another example of an estimate comes from integration. If $f,g$ are two integrable functions on an interval $[a,b]$ that satisfy $|f(x)-g(x)|<\epsilon$ throughout the interval, then
$$\left|\int_a^b f(x)\,dx - \int_a^b g(x)\,dx\right| \le \int_a^b |f(x)-g(x)|\,dx \le (b-a)\epsilon.$$
Thus the error in the integral is bounded by a uniform error in the functions, so if $f$ is an approximation to the function $g$ in this sense, then the error in integral of $f$ is controlled by the uniform approximation error. By estimating the mean distance between functions by a maximum difference between them in this way is how one proves, in particular, that uniform convergence of integrable functions on the same bounded interval implies convergence of the integrals.

=== Continuity ===
Continuity also plays a key role in analysis. In elementary analysis, the idea of a continuous function is introduced using an epsilon-delta definition. Roughly, a function is continuous at a point if sufficiently small changes in the input produce small changes in the output. This rules out "jumps" in the graph of the function, or other kinds of pathological oscillatory behavior.

Continuity is important in analysis because it allows local control of a function to imply global conclusions when combined with additional hypotheses such as connectedness or compactness. For example, continuous real-valued functions on intervals have the intermediate value property, and continuous real-valued functions on compact sets attain maximum and minimum values. Continuous functions on compact metric spaces are also uniformly continuous, meaning that the function oscillates on a comparable scale throughout the domain. These results are basic tools in calculus, optimization, differential equations, and approximation theory.

Continuous functions generalize readily to metric spaces and other topological spaces. Spaces of continuous functions are among the most studied in functional analysis, where they provide useful structural probes of a space. In differential equations, continuity is also a threshold regularity condition: in more advanced analysis, regularity theorems often show that objects first defined only weakly, almost everywhere, or distributionally have continuous representatives under additional hypotheses, and can thus be treated as honest functions rather than more general objects.

=== Metric spaces ===
A metric space is a set where a notion of distance (called a metric) between elements of the set is defined.

Much of analysis happens in some metric space; the most commonly used are the real line, the complex plane, Euclidean space, other vector spaces, and the integers.

Much of functional analysis is concerned with spaces of functions, which can be given the structure of a metric space, such as Banach spaces and Hilbert spaces. In many of these examples, the metric comes from a norm. For example, the space of continuous real-valued functions $C([0,1])$ on the unit interval is a Banach space under the supremum norm. The spaces of primary importance in measure theory and harmonic analysis are the L^{p} spaces, which are metric spaces whose metrics again come from a norm, are complete; i.e., they are Banach spaces.

Metric spaces are extremely convenient in analysis because many of the strong approximation results that hold in Euclidean space carry over to metric spaces with minimal changes. For example, compactness in metric spaces is equivalent to sequential compactness, so limiting arguments on metric spaces can be comparatively straightforward in metric spaces as opposed to in more general spaces in analysis. Compact metric spaces and complete metric spaces are especially important in analysis, where many arguments require the existence of limits.

=== Complex variables ===
Complex numbers provide another important tool for many analytic equations. A complex-valued function of a complex variable is holomorphic if its derivative exists as a complex limit at each point of its domain. Holomorphic functions are much more rigid than differentiable functions of a real variable: they are analytic functions, represented locally by convergent power series.

An important tool in complex variables is contour integration, in which functions are integrated along curves in the complex plane. The Cauchy integral theorem, Cauchy integral formula, and residue theorem relate the values of a holomorphic or meromorphic function to its behavior on curves and near singularities. These results allow one to shift contours when integrating a holomorphic function, provided the deformation of the contour does not cross a singularity. This is useful in evaluating many real integrals, and in the study of functions through their singularities.

In operator theory and spectral theory, the resolvent of an operator encodes information about its spectrum and often allows functions of operators to be defined by complex integration. Complex variables thus appear in connection with differential and integral equations, eigenvalue problems, and the theory of linear operators.

=== Measures, averaging, and probability ===
Measure theory gives a systematic way of assigning sizes to subsets of a space, in a way that generalizes length, area, and volume in Euclidean space. Abstractly, measure theory begins by specifying a class of sets which are measurable, that is, sets that have a measure. The measurable sets form a sigma algebra, meaning that one can take countable unions and intersections, as well as set complements. Measures are then defined in such a way as to be compatible with the set operations on the measurable sets.

In measure theory, pointwise convergence of functions can be replaced with the notion of convergence almost everywhere, that is, convergence at every point except a set whose measure is zero. Convergence almost everywhere is much more convenient in measure theory: often various types of mean convergence cannot control a precise set on which pointwise convergence fails, but can ensure that the bad set has measure zero. Functions are often identified if they agree almost everywhere, that is, off a set of measure zero. Thus measure zero sets are often in practice simply ignored.

The Lebesgue integral extends the Riemann integral, and is better adapted to the limiting processes of analysis. The idea of the Lebesgue integral, for a non-negative function $f$, is that it possible to form a rearrangement of its values to form a decreasing function, using the measure of its superlevel sets to define the rearrangement. Integration of decreasing functions have better limit properties under integration, and that good behavior can be transferred to the Lebesgue integral. One has theorems like monotone convergence, Fatou's lemma, and the dominated convergence theorem that simplify many limit arguments.

Measure theory also supplies the underlying mathematics of probability theory. A probability space is a measure space whose total measure is one, and expected values are integrals with respect to this probability measure.

Many function spaces in analysis are defined using measures. The L^{p} spaces consist of functions whose powers are integrable, with functions identified when they agree almost everywhere. These spaces are important throughout analysis, such as in harmonic analysis and partial differential equations.

=== Decomposing functions into simpler pieces ===
Another theme in analysis is that of decomposing functions into simpler pieces, determined by symmetry, scale, or oscillation. The prototypical example is that of Fourier series, which decomposes a periodic function into basic sinusoids. The Fourier series takes the form of a trigonometric series
$$\sum_{n=-\infty}^\infty c_n e^{in\theta}$$
where $c_n$ are complex numbers and $\theta$ is the independent variable.

The Fourier series is one instance of an eigenfunction expansion, with the exponentials $e^{in\theta}$ being the eigenfunctions of the rotation group acting on the circle. It has the property of being an orthogonal expansion: any two of the eigenfunctions are orthogonal in the Hilbert space of square integrable functions on the circle. Eigenfunction expansions appear in many areas in mathematical analysis, and particularly in its applications to the sciences where symmetry is often important. An example of a different sort of eigenfunction expansion is the decomposition of a function on the sphere into spherical harmonics. Again, this is an orthogonal expansion, and orthogonality of the expansion leads to a tractable isolation of each space.

Expansions can be used to study convergence and approximation, smoothness and oscillation, decay, and solutions of differential equations. Sobolev spaces, for example, relate the smoothness of functions to the decay of their Fourier coefficients. These representations can exhibit structural information that may be difficult to see from the original form of a function.

Fourier analysis is the study of such decompositions, chiefly focused on the Fourier transform and some of its generalizations.

=== Dynamics and evolution ===
Many problems in analysis concern how quantities change over time or under repeated application of a rule. This leads to ordinary differential equations and partial differential equations, where one studies functions whose derivatives satisfy prescribed relations. For repeated applications of a rule, one studies iterates of a function or transformation, giving rise to discrete dynamical systems.

Analytic questions in dynamics include existence and uniqueness of solutions, stability, approximation of trajectories, long-time behavior, and dependence on initial conditions. For example, a differential equation may determine a flow on a space, while iteration of a map produces an orbit. Analytic tools are used to determine whether such orbits converge, remain bounded, become periodic, or exhibit more complicated behavior.

Dynamics is an important application of analytic methods, and leads to ideas and techniques within analysis itself. In ergodic theory, the key objects are transformations that preserve a measure, and one asks how time averages along orbits relate to space averages over the whole system. The basic theory concerns whether time averages of functions become equal to their spatial averages under the orbit of a system, and how rapidly that approximation takes place. In functional analysis, evolution problems are often studied using one-parameter families of operators, such as operator semigroups, which generalize the exponential function from numbers or matrices to infinite-dimensional spaces.

=== Operators and spectral theory ===
Many areas of analysis study operators, like differential operators, integral operators, or linear transformations on a function space or other topological vector space. Operators can encode information such as the evolution of a system, a differential or integral equation, or a quantum state or observable. The spectral theory of operators allows operators to be broken into pieces and represented, generalizing aspects of the eigenvalue decomposition from linear algebra to infinite dimensions. As in linear algebra, it is often possible to understand an operator more deeply through its spectral decomposition.

== Main branches ==
=== Calculus ===
Calculus is a branch of analysis that deals primarily with calculation and applications. The two branches of calculus are: integral calculus, which deals with the study of averages, accumulation, and area; and differential calculus, which studies rates of change, linear approximation, and the derivative. Examples of applications of calculus include how to work with approximations such as Taylor approximations and Taylor series, integration in elementary terms, numerical approximations to integration, and basic optimization.

Vector analysis, also called vector calculus, is part of calculus that deals with vector-valued functions.

=== Real analysis ===
Real analysis (traditionally, the "theory of functions of a real variable") is a branch of mathematical analysis dealing with the real numbers and real-valued functions of a real variable. In particular, it deals with the properties of real functions and sequences, including convergence and limits of sequences of real numbers, providing rigorous foundations for calculus, and continuity, smoothness and related properties of real-valued functions.

=== Complex analysis ===
Complex analysis (traditionally known as the "theory of functions of a complex variable") is the branch of mathematical analysis that investigates functions of complex numbers. It is useful in many branches of mathematics, including algebraic geometry, number theory, applied mathematics; as well as in physics, including hydrodynamics, thermodynamics, mechanical engineering, electrical engineering, and particularly, quantum field theory.

Complex analysis is particularly concerned with the analytic functions of complex variables (or, more generally, meromorphic functions). Because the separate real and imaginary parts of any analytic function must satisfy Laplace's equation, complex analysis is widely applicable to two-dimensional problems in physics.

=== Functional analysis ===
Functional analysis is a branch of mathematical analysis, the core of which is formed by the study of vector spaces endowed with some kind of limit-related structure (e.g. inner product, norm, topology, etc.) and the linear operators acting upon these spaces and respecting these structures in a suitable sense. The historical roots of functional analysis lie in the study of spaces of functions and the formulation of properties of transformations of functions such as the Fourier transform as transformations defining continuous, unitary etc. operators between function spaces. This point of view turned out to be particularly useful for the study of differential and integral equations.

=== Fourier analysis ===
Fourier analysis is a branch of mathematical analysis concerned with the representation of functions and signals as the superposition of basic waves. This includes the study of the notions of Fourier series and Fourier transforms, and of their generalizations. Fourier analysis also includes the study of linear differential operators with constant coefficients and their generalizations to pseudodifferential operators.

Microlocal analysis is a subfield of Fourier analysis concerned with how to localize the singularities of functions, and the how they propagate under differential and pseudodifferetial operators.

=== Harmonic analysis ===
Harmonic analysis is a branch of mathematics having origins in the study of harmonic functions, and especially their boundary values. Harmonic function theory leads naturally to the study of function spaces like Hardy spaces, and in particular criteria for membership in such spaces and estimates of operators. It includes many of the methods of Fourier analysis, but also other decomposition methods such as Calderón–Zygmund decompositions which break functions into parts that can be handled by Fourier methods and parts that can be handled by local methods.

Abstract harmonic analysis is a related tradition, which generalizes Fourier methods to groups other than those to which classical Fourier methods apply.

=== Differential equations ===
A differential equation is a mathematical equation for an unknown function of one or several variables that relates the values of the function itself and its derivatives of various orders. Differential equations play a prominent role in engineering, physics, economics, biology, and other disciplines.

Differential equations arise in many areas of science and technology, specifically whenever a deterministic relation involving some continuously varying quantities (modeled by functions) and their rates of change in space or time (expressed as derivatives) is known or postulated. This is illustrated in classical mechanics, where the motion of a body is described by its position and velocity as the time value varies. Newton's laws allow one (given the position, velocity, acceleration and various forces acting on the body) to express these variables dynamically as a differential equation for the unknown position of the body as a function of time. In some cases, this differential equation (called an equation of motion) may be solved explicitly.

=== Measure theory ===
A measure on a set is a systematic way to assign a number to each suitable subset of that set, intuitively interpreted as its size. In this sense, a measure is a generalization of the concepts of length, area, and volume. A particularly important example is the Lebesgue measure on a Euclidean space, which assigns the conventional length, area, and volume of Euclidean geometry to suitable subsets of the $n$-dimensional Euclidean space $\mathbb{R}^n$. For instance, the Lebesgue measure of the interval $\left[0, 1\right]$ in the real numbers is its length in the everyday sense of the word – specifically, 1.

Technically, a measure is a function that assigns a non-negative real number or +∞ to (certain) subsets of a set $X$. It must assign 0 to the empty set and be (countably) additive: the measure of a 'large' subset that can be decomposed into a finite (or countable) number of 'smaller' disjoint subsets, is the sum of the measures of the "smaller" subsets. Sometimes it is necessary to define measure only on a sub-collection of all subsets, because it is impossible to assign a consistent measure to all subsets with the required properties; the so-called measurable subsets, which are required to form a $\sigma$-algebra. This means that the empty set, countable unions, countable intersections and complements of measurable subsets are measurable. Non-measurable sets in a Euclidean space, on which the Lebesgue measure cannot be defined consistently, are necessarily complicated in the sense of being badly mixed up with their complement. Indeed, their existence is a non-trivial consequence of the axiom of choice.

=== Numerical analysis ===
Numerical analysis is the study of algorithms that use numerical approximation (as opposed to general symbolic manipulations) for the problems of mathematical analysis (as distinguished from discrete mathematics).

Modern numerical analysis does not seek exact answers, because exact answers are often impossible to obtain in practice. Instead, much of numerical analysis is concerned with obtaining approximate solutions while maintaining reasonable bounds on errors.

Numerical analysis naturally finds applications in all fields of engineering and the physical sciences, but in the 21st century, the life sciences and even the arts have adopted elements of scientific computations. Ordinary differential equations appear in celestial mechanics (planets, stars and galaxies); numerical linear algebra is important for data analysis; stochastic differential equations and Markov chains are essential in simulating living cells for medicine and biology.

=== Geometric analysis and global analysis ===
Geometric analysis is the branch of analysis concerned with the study of manifolds, often Riemannian manifolds. Global questions of Riemannian geometry are often studied. One example is the spectral geometry of the Laplace–Beltrami operator, which generalizes the problem of hearing the shape of a drum, for instance. Other global questions in geometric analysis include partial differential equations on Riemannian manfiolds, such as the Yamabe equation and the Ricci flow. The latter led to the proof of the Poincaré conjecture.

=== Convex analysis ===
Convex analysis is the branch of analysis concerned with convex functions, convex sets, and applications to optimization and linear programming. Convex functions generally have more powerful methods available for ensuring the existence and uniqueness of minima, particularly when combined with lower semicontinuity. There are many dualities in convex optimization, often expressed in terms of the convex conjugate, which allow an optimization problem to be paired with a dual problem, which gives a useful criterion for checking optimality of a putative solution or determining how much slack there is in a numerical solution.

=== Calculus of variations ===
Calculus of variations is the study of finding optimal solutions to minimization problems in infinite dimensional spaces. A basic example is to find a geodesic on a surface: the endpoints are given, and one must find a path among the infinite-dimensional space of all possible paths, that minimizes the arc length. Many problems in partial differential equations admit a more natural variational characterization, and this can lead to notions of weak solutions, which are often more suited to analytic methods and numerical work. Direct methods in the calculus of variations formulate variational problems globally on function spaces, using ideas from convex analysis.

Optimal transport is the sub-branch of the calculus of variations concerned with the formulation and solution of the problem of transporting stuff from one place to another subject to cost constraints. This sub-branch also shares many ideas with convex analysis, including duality theorems such as Kantorovich duality, which is a form of Legendre duality. The ideas of optimal transportation have wide and unexpected applications, such as the Wasserstein metric and its applications to machine learning.

=== Probability theory and stochastic analysis ===
Probability theory is closely connected with mathematical analysis through measure theory. In the modern axiomatic formulation, a probability space is a measure space of total measure one, random variables are measurable functions, and expected values are integrals with respect to a probability measure. Analytic methods are central in the study of convergence of random variables, martingales, stochastic processes, Brownian motion, stochastic differential equations, and ergodic theory.

Probability theory is an area of mathematics in its own right, but many of its modern foundations and methods belong to analysis. Stochastic analysis studies analytic questions involving random processes, including stochastic integration, stochastic differential equations, and connections with partial differential equations and functional analysis.

== Other topics ==
- Clifford analysis, the study of Clifford valued functions that are annihilated by Dirac or Dirac-like operators, termed in general as monogenic or Clifford analytic functions.
- p-adic analysis, the study of analysis within the context of p-adic numbers, which differs in some interesting and surprising ways from its real and complex counterparts.
- Non-standard analysis, which investigates the hyperreal numbers and their functions and gives a rigorous treatment of infinitesimals and infinitely large numbers.
- Computable analysis, the study of which parts of analysis can be carried out in a computable manner.
- Set-valued analysis – applies ideas from analysis and topology to set-valued functions.
- Idempotent analysis – analysis in the context of an idempotent semiring, where the lack of an additive inverse is compensated somewhat by the idempotent rule A + A = A.
  - Tropical analysis – analysis of the idempotent semiring called the tropical semiring (or max-plus algebra/min-plus algebra).
- Constructive analysis, which is built upon a foundation of constructive, rather than classical, logic and set theory.
- Intuitionistic analysis, which is developed from constructive logic like constructive analysis but also incorporates choice sequences.
- Paraconsistent analysis, which is built upon a foundation of paraconsistent, rather than classical, logic and set theory.
- Smooth infinitesimal analysis, which is developed in a smooth topos.
- Dynamical systems, which is the study of the behavior of systems under time-evolution.

== Applications ==
Techniques from analysis are also found in other areas such as:

=== Physical sciences ===
The vast majority of classical mechanics, relativity, and quantum mechanics is based on applied analysis, and differential equations in particular. Examples of important differential equations include Newton's second law, the Schrödinger equation, and the Einstein field equations.

Functional analysis is also a major factor in quantum mechanics.

=== Signal processing ===
When processing signals, such as audio, radio waves, light waves, seismic waves, and even images, Fourier analysis can isolate individual components of a compound waveform, concentrating them for easier detection or removal. A large family of signal processing techniques consist of Fourier-transforming a signal, manipulating the Fourier-transformed data in a simple way, and reversing the transformation.

=== Other areas of mathematics ===
Techniques from analysis are used in many areas of mathematics, including:

- Analytic number theory
- Analytic combinatorics
- Continuous probability
- Differential entropy in information theory
- Differential games
- Differential geometry, the application of calculus to specific mathematical spaces known as manifolds that possess a complicated internal structure but behave in a simple manner locally.
- Differentiable manifolds
- Differential topology
- Partial differential equations

== Notable textbooks ==
- Leonhard Euler (1748) Introductio in analysin infinitorum
- A. L. Cauchy (1821) Cours d'analyse
- Camille Jordan (1882) Cours d'analyse de l'École polytechnique
- G. H. Hardy (1908) A Course of Pure Mathematics
- E. T. Whittaker & G. N. Watson (1915) A Course of Modern Analysis
- George Pólya & Gábor Szegő (1925) Problems and Theorems in Analysis (two volumes)
- Walter Rudin (1953) Principles of Mathematical Analysis
- Elias M. Stein & Rami Shakarchi (2003, 2011) Princeton Lectures in Analysis (four volumes)

== See also ==
- Arithmetization of analysis
- Constructive analysis
- History of calculus
- Hypercomplex analysis
- Multiple rule-based problems
- Multivariable calculus
- Paraconsistent logic
- Smooth infinitesimal analysis
- Timeline of calculus and mathematical analysis
