= Tropical projective space =

Conventional visualization of the tropical projective plane, with projection of the real coordinate axes.

In tropical geometry, a tropical projective space is the tropical analog of the classic projective space.

== Definition ==
Given a module M over the tropical semiring T, its projectivization is the usual projective space of a module: the quotient space of the module (omitting the additive identity 0) under scalar multiplication, omitting multiplication by the scalar additive identity 0: (Note: As usual, scalar multiplication of any vector by 0 yields the identity for vector addition 0, so these must be omitted or all vectors will be identified.)

$$\mathbf{T}(M) := (M \setminus \mathbf{0})/(\mathbf{T} \setminus 0).$$

In the tropical setting, tropical multiplication is classical addition, with unit real number 0 (not 1); tropical addition is minimum or maximum (depending on convention), with unit extended real number ∞ (not 0), (Note: ∞ can be interpreted as either positive or negative infinity, depending on convention.) so it is clearer to write this using the extended real numbers, rather than the abstract algebraic units:

$$\mathbf{T}(M) := (M \setminus \boldsymbol{\infty})/(\mathbf{T} \setminus \infty).$$

Just as in the classical case, the standard n-dimensional tropical projective space is defined as the quotient of the standard (n+1)-dimensional coordinate space by scalar multiplication, with all operations defined coordinate-wise:

$$\mathbf{TP}^n := (\mathbf{T}^{n+1} \setminus \boldsymbol{\infty})/(\mathbf{T} \setminus \infty).$$

Tropical multiplication corresponds to classical addition, so tropical scalar multiplication by c corresponds to adding c to all coordinates. Thus two elements of $\mathbf T^{n+1} \setminus \boldsymbol{\infty}$ are identified if their coordinates differ by the same additive amount c:

$$(x_0, \dots, x_n) \sim (y_0, \dots, y_n) \iff (x_0 + c, \dots, x_n + c) = (y_0, \dots, y_n).$$
