= Tropical cryptography =

Cryptography using tropical algebra

In tropical analysis, tropical cryptography refers to the study of a class of cryptographic protocols built upon tropical algebras. In many cases, tropical cryptographic schemes have arisen from adapting classical (non-tropical) schemes to instead rely on tropical algebras. The case for the use of tropical algebras in cryptography rests on at least two key features of tropical mathematics: in the tropical world, there is no classical multiplication (a computationally expensive operation), and the problem of solving systems of tropical polynomial equations has been shown to be NP-hard.

== Basic Definitions ==
The key mathematical object at the heart of tropical cryptography is the tropical semiring $(\mathbb{R} \cup \{\infty\},\oplus,\otimes)$ (also known as the min-plus algebra), or a generalization thereof. The operations are defined as follows for $x,y \in \mathbb{R} \cup \{\infty\}$:

$x \oplus y = \min\{x,y\}$
$x \otimes y = x + y$

It is easily verified that with $\infty$ as the additive identity, these binary operations on $\mathbb{R} \cup \{\infty\}$ form a semiring.
