= Tropical analysis =

Study of the tropical semiring

In the mathematical discipline of idempotent analysis, tropical analysis is the study of the tropical semiring.

== Applications ==
The max tropical semiring can be used appropriately to determine marking times within a given Petri net and a vector filled with marking state at the beginning: $-\infty$ (unit for max, tropical addition) means "never before", while 0 (unit for addition, tropical multiplication) is "no additional time".

Tropical cryptography is cryptography based on the tropical semiring.

Tropical geometry is an analog to algebraic geometry, using the tropical semiring.

== See also ==
- Lunar arithmetic
