= Semimodule =

Algebraic structure

In mathematics, a semimodule over a semiring R is an algebraic structure analogous to a module over a ring, with the exception that it forms only a commutative monoid with respect to its addition operation, as opposed to an abelian group.

== Definition ==
Formally, a left R-semimodule consists of an additively-written commutative monoid M and a map from $R \times M$ to M satisfying the following axioms:

1. $r (m + n) = rm + rn$
2. $(r + s) m = rm + sm$
3. $(rs)m = r(sm)$
4. $1m = m$
5. $0_R m = r 0_M = 0_M$.

A right R-semimodule can be defined similarly. For modules over a ring, the last axiom follows from the others. This is not the case with semimodules.

== Examples ==
If R is a ring, then any R-module is an R-semimodule. Conversely, it follows from the second, fourth, and last axioms that (−1)m is an additive inverse of m for all $m \in M$, so any semimodule over a ring is in fact a module.

Any semiring is a left and right semimodule over itself in the same way that a ring is a left and right module over itself. Every commutative monoid is uniquely an $\mathbb{N}$-semimodule in the same way that an abelian group is a $\mathbb{Z}$-module.
