= Amoeba (mathematics) =

Set associated with a complex-valued polynomial

The amoeba of $P(z,w) = w - 2z - 1.$

The amoeba of $P(z,w) = 3z^2 + 5zw + w^3 + 1.$ Notice the "vacuole" in the middle of the amoeba.

The amoeba of $P(z,w) = 1 + z + z^2 + z^3 + z^2 w^3 + 10zw + 12z^2 w + 10z^2 w^2.$

The amoeba of $P(z,w) = 50z^3 + 83z^2 w + 24zw^2 + w^3 + 392z^2 + 414zw + 50w^2 - 28z + 59w - 100.$

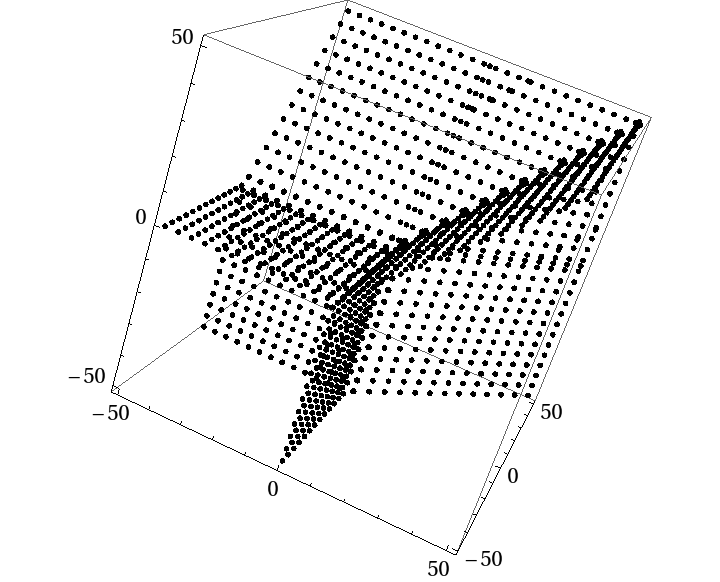
Points in the amoeba of $P(x,y,z) = x + y + z - 1.$ Note that the amoeba is actually 3-dimensional, and not a surface (this is not entirely evident from the image).

In complex analysis, a branch of mathematics, an amoeba is a set associated with a polynomial in one or more complex variables. Amoebas have applications in algebraic geometry, especially tropical geometry.

== Definition ==
Consider the function

$$\operatorname{Log}: \big({\mathbb C} \setminus \{0\}\big)^n \to \mathbb R^n$$

defined on the set of all n-tuples $z = (z_1, z_2, \dots, z_n)$ of non-zero complex numbers with values in the Euclidean space $\mathbb R^n,$ given by the formula

$$\operatorname{Log}(z_1, z_2, \dots, z_n) = \big(\log|z_1|, \log|z_2|, \dots, \log|z_n|\big).$$

Here, log denotes the natural logarithm. If p(z) is a polynomial in $n$ complex variables, its amoeba $\mathcal A_p$ is defined as the image of the set of zeros of p under Log, so

$$\mathcal A_p = \left\{\operatorname{Log}(z) : z \in \big(\mathbb C \setminus \{0\}\big)^n, p(z) = 0\right\}.$$

Amoebas were introduced in 1994 in a book by Gelfand, Kapranov, and Zelevinsky.

== Properties ==
Let $V \subset (\mathbb{C}^{*})^{n}$ be the zero locus of a polynomial

$$f(z) = \sum_{j \in A}a_{j}z^{j}$$

where $A \subset \mathbb{Z}^{n}$ is finite, $a_{j} \in \mathbb{C}$ and $z^{j} = z_{1}^{j_{1}}\cdots z_{n}^{j_{n}}$ if $z = (z_{1},\dots,z_{n})$ and $j = (j_{1},\dots,j_{n})$. Let $\Delta_{f}$ be the Newton polyhedron of $f$, i.e.,

$$\Delta_{f} = \text{Convex Hull}\{j \in A \mid a_{j} \ne 0\}.$$

Then

- Any amoeba is a closed set.
- Any connected component of the complement $\mathbb R^n \setminus \mathcal A_p$ is convex.
- The area of an amoeba of a not identically zero polynomial in two complex variables is finite.
- A two-dimensional amoeba has a number of "tentacles", which are infinitely long and exponentially narrow towards infinity.
- The number of connected components of the complement $\mathbb{R}^{n} \setminus \mathcal{A}_{p}$ is not greater than $\#(\Delta_{f} \cap \mathbb{Z}^{n})$ and not less than the number of vertices of $\Delta_{f}$.
- There is an injection from the set of connected components of complement $\mathbb{R}^{n} \setminus \mathcal{A}_{p}$ to $\Delta_{f} \cap \mathbb{Z}^{n}$. The vertices of $\Delta_{f}$ are in the image under this injection. A connected component of complement $\mathbb{R}^{n} \setminus \mathcal{A}_{p}$ is bounded if and only if its image is in the interior of $\Delta_{f}$.
- If $V \subset (\mathbb{C}^{*})^{2}$, then the area of $\mathcal{A}_{p}(V)$ is not greater than $\pi^{2}\text{Area}(\Delta_{f})$.

== Ronkin function ==
A useful tool in studying amoebas is the Ronkin function. For p(z), a polynomial in n complex variables, one defines the Ronkin function

$$N_p : \mathbb R^n \to \mathbb R$$

by the formula

$$N_p(x) = \frac{1}{(2\pi i)^n} \int_{\operatorname{Log}^{-1}(x)} \log|p(z)| \,\frac{dz_1}{z_1} \wedge \frac{dz_2}{z_2} \wedge \cdots \wedge \frac{dz_n}{z_n},$$

where $x$ denotes $x = (x_1, x_2, \dots, x_n).$ Equivalently, $N_p$ is given by the integral

$$N_p(x) = \frac{1}{(2\pi)^n} \int_{[0, 2\pi]^n} \log|p(z)| \,d\theta_1 \,d\theta_2 \cdots d\theta_n,$$

where

$$z = \left(e^{x_1+i\theta_1}, e^{x_2+i\theta_2}, \dots, e^{x_n+i\theta_n}\right).$$

The Ronkin function is convex and affine on each connected component of the complement of the amoeba of $p(z)$.

As an example, the Ronkin function of a monomial

$$p(z) = a z_1^{k_1} z_2^{k_2} \dots z_n^{k_n}$$

with $a \ne 0$ is

$$N_p(x) = \log|a| + k_1 x_1 + k_2 x_2 + \cdots + k_n x_n.$$
