= Near-semiring =

In mathematics, a near-semiring, also called a seminearring, is an algebraic structure more general than a near-ring or a semiring. Near-semirings arise naturally from functions on monoids.

== Definition ==
A near-semiring is a set S with two binary operations "+" and "·", and a constant 0 such that (S, +, 0) is a monoid (not necessarily commutative), (S, ·) is a semigroup, these structures are related by a single (right or left) distributive law, and accordingly 0 is a one-sided (right or left, respectively) absorbing element.

Formally, an algebraic structure (S, +, ·, 0) is said to be a near-semiring if it satisfies the following axioms:

1. (S, +, 0) is a monoid,
2. (S, ·) is a semigroup,
3. (a + b) · c = a · c + b · c, for all a, b, c in S, and
4. 0 · a = 0 for all a in S.

Near-semirings are a common abstraction of semirings and near-rings [Golan, 1999; Pilz, 1983]. The standard examples of near-semirings are typically of the form M(Г), the set of all mappings on a monoid (Г; +, 0), equipped with composition of mappings, pointwise addition of mappings, and the zero function. Subsets of M(Г) closed under the operations provide further examples of near-semirings. Another example is the ordinals under the usual operations of ordinal arithmetic (here Clause 3 should be replaced with its symmetric form c · (a + b) = c · a + c · b. Strictly speaking, the class of all ordinals is not a set, so the above example should be more appropriately called a class near-semiring. We get a near-semiring in the standard sense if we restrict to those ordinals strictly less than some multiplicatively indecomposable ordinal.

== Bibliography ==
- Golan, Jonathan S., Semirings and their applications. Updated and expanded version of The theory of semirings, with applications to mathematics and theoretical computer science (Longman Sci. Tech., Harlow, 1992, MR1163371. Kluwer Academic Publishers, Dordrecht, 1999. xii+381 pp. ISBN 0-7923-5786-8 MR1746739
- Krishna, K. V., Near-semirings: Theory and application, Ph.D. thesis, IIT Delhi, New Delhi, India, 2005.
- Pilz, G., Near-Rings: The Theory and Its Applications, Vol. 23 of North-Holland Mathematics Studies, North-Holland Publishing Company, 1983.
- The Near Ring Main Page at the Johannes Kepler Universität Linz
- Willy G. van Hoorn and B. van Rootselaar, Fundamental notions in the theory of seminearrings, Compositio Mathematica v. 18, (1967), pp. 65–78.
