= Günter Pilz =

Austrian mathematician

Günter Pilz (born 1945 in Bad Hall, Upper Austria) is professor of mathematics at the Johannes Kepler University (JKU) Linz. Until his retirement in 2013 he was the head of the Institute of Algebra.

== Vita ==
After studying mathematics and physics at the University of Vienna (1963–1967) and his PhD (1967), Günter Pilz was assistant professor at several institutions: at the department of mathematics of the University of Vienna (1966–1968), at the department of statistics at the Vienna University of Technology (1968–1969), as research associate at the department of mathematics, University of Arizona, United States (1969–1970) and at the department of mathematics at the University of Linz (1970–1974). In 1971, he received his Habilitation. In 1974, he was promoted to a professor of mathematics at the JKU. He was head of the department of mathematics in Linz (1980–1983 und 1987–1993) and head of the Institute of Algebra (since 1996).

From 1996 to 2000, Günter Pilz was dean of studies at the Faculty of Science and Technology and from 2000 to 2007 vice rector for research. Also, he was the chairman in the “Forum Research” of the Austrian Conference of Rectors from 2001 to 2005 and was chosen in 2003 to be the Austrian representative for Research Integrity in the corresponding OECD group.

His main area of research is the theory and applications of algebraic structures. He is honorary professor at the Shandong University of Technology in China and Honorary Doctor from the Ural State University in Ekaterinburg, Russia. He was also a member in the Council for Research and Technology in Upper Austria (2003–2008).

== Main areas of research ==
- Theory and applications of near-rings: these are "collections of objects with which one can calculate almost as well as with numbers". These near-rings have numerous applications, for instance in the construction of optimal designs for statistical experiments.

== Prizes ==
- Honorary medal in silver, by the County of Upper Austria (2007/08)
