= Idempotent analysis =

Area of math

In mathematical analysis, idempotent analysis is the study of idempotent semirings, such as the tropical semiring. The lack of an additive inverse in the semiring is compensated somewhat by the idempotent rule $A \oplus A = A$.
