= François Baccelli =

French academic (born 1954)

François Louis Baccelli
- Born: December 20, 1954 (age 71)
- Education: University of Paris-Sud
- Awards: ACM Sigmetrics Achievement award, IEEE Rice Award, IEEE Abraham Award, Grand Prix France Telecom of the French Academy of Sciences.
- Scientific career
- Workplaces: INRIA; École polytechnique University of Texas at Austin
- Thesis: Modèles Probabilistes de systèmes informatiques distribués (1983)
- Doctoral advisor: Erol Gelenbe
- Website: www.ma.utexas.edu/users/baccelli/

François Louis Baccelli (born December 20, 1954) is senior researcher at INRIA Paris, in charge of the ERC project NEMO on network mathematics.

== Education and career ==
Baccelli obtained his PhD at the University of Paris-Sud in 1983 under the supervision of Erol Gelenbe. Between 1991 and 2003, he was a faculty member at the applied mathematics department at École polytechnique. He was Simons Chair in mathematics and electrical and computer engineering at University of Texas at Austin between 2012 and 2021. Between 2012 and 2019, he was the head of the Simons Center on Communication, Information and Network Mathematics.

== Research ==
Baccelli's research is at the interface between mathematics (probability theory, stochastic geometry, dynamical systems) and communications (information theory, wireless networks, network science).

- His work with P. Brémaud on the stationary-ergodic framework for queuing networks represents such networks as functionals of point processes on the real line. This led to mathematical tools which are now commonly used in applied probability and in the communication network literature.
- Jointly with G. Cohen, J.P. Quadrat and G.J. Olsder, he contributed to the development of an algebraic theory for the dynamics of networks, the so-called (max, plus) algebra. This impacted several fields of engineering (network calculus) and mathematics (tropical geometry).
- He is best known for contributions to stochastic geometry. His results on the Poisson-Voronoi model, the Poisson-Shannon model, and the Poisson-Voronoi-Shannon model laid the foundations of the representation of communication networks as functional of point processes in the Euclidean space. This led to wireless stochastic geometry, initially developed with B. Blaszczyszyn, which is now commonly used in the communication network literature.
- His current research interests are in stochastic geometry in high dimension, in the theory of stationary point processes, and in the mathematics of unimodular random graphs.

== Honors and awards ==
Baccelli is a member of the French Academy of Sciences. He was inducted in 2005. He was awarded a Math+X chair by the Simons Foundation in 2012. He received an honorary doctorate of Heriot-Watt University, Edinburgh, in 2016, the ACM Sigmetrics Achievement Award, in 2014, and the Grand Prix France Telecom, of the French Academy of Sciences in 2002. In 2014, he was awarded both the Stephen O. Rice Prize and the 2014 Leonard G. Abraham Prize by the IEEE Communications Society.
