= Near-ring =

Algebraic structure in mathematics

In mathematics, a near-ring (also near ring or nearring) is an algebraic structure similar to a ring but satisfying fewer axioms. Near-rings arise naturally from functions on groups.

== Definition ==
A set N together with two binary operations + (called addition) and ⋅ (called multiplication) is called a (right) near-ring if:

- N is a group (not necessarily abelian) under addition;
- multiplication is associative (so N is a semigroup under multiplication); and
- multiplication on the right distributes over addition: for any x, y, z in N, it holds that (x + y)⋅z = (x⋅z) + (y⋅z).

Similarly, it is possible to define a left near-ring by replacing the right distributive law by the corresponding left distributive law. Both right and left near-rings occur in the literature; for instance, the book of Pilz uses right near-rings, while the book of Clay uses left near-rings.

An immediate consequence of this one-sided distributive law is that it is true that 0⋅x = 0 but it is not necessarily true that x⋅0 = 0 for any x in N. Another immediate consequence is that (−x)⋅y = −(x⋅y) for any x, y in N, but it is not necessary that x⋅(−y) = −(x⋅y). A near-ring is a rng if and only if addition is commutative and multiplication is also distributive over addition on the left. If the near-ring has a multiplicative identity, then distributivity on both sides is sufficient, and commutativity of addition follows automatically.

== Mappings from a group to itself ==
Let G be a group, written additively but not necessarily abelian, and let M(G) be the set {f | f : G → G} of all functions from G to G. An addition operation can be defined on M(G): given f, g in M(G), then the mapping f + g from G to G is given by (f + g)(x) = f(x) + g(x) for all x in G. Then (M(G), +) is also a group, which is abelian if and only if G is abelian. Taking the composition of mappings as the product ⋅, M(G) becomes a near-ring.

The 0 element of the near-ring M(G) is the zero map, i.e., the mapping which takes every element of G to the identity element of G. The additive inverse −f of f in M(G) coincides with the natural pointwise definition, that is, (−f)(x) = −(f(x)) for all x in G.

If G has at least two elements, then M(G) is not a ring, even if G is abelian. (Consider a constant mapping g from G to a fixed element g ≠ 0 of G; then g⋅0 = g ≠ 0.) However, there is a subset E(G) of M(G) consisting of all group endomorphisms of G, that is, all maps f : G → G such that f(x + y) = f(x) + f(y) for all x, y in G. If (G, +) is abelian, both near-ring operations on M(G) are closed on E(G), and (E(G), +, ⋅) is a ring. If (G, +) is nonabelian, E(G) is generally not closed under the near-ring operations; but the closure of E(G) under the near-ring operations is a near-ring.

Many subsets of M(G) form interesting and useful near-rings. For example:

- The mappings for which f(0) = 0.
- The constant mappings, i.e., those that map every element of the group to one fixed element.
- The set of maps generated by addition and negation from the endomorphisms of the group (the "additive closure" of the set of endomorphisms). If G is abelian then the set of endomorphisms is already additively closed, so that the additive closure is just the set of endomorphisms of G, and it forms not just a near-ring, but a ring.

Further examples occur if the group has further structure, for example:

- The continuous mappings in a topological group.
- The polynomial functions on a ring with identity under addition and polynomial composition.
- The affine maps in a vector space.

Every near-ring is isomorphic to a subnear-ring of M(G) for some G.

== Applications ==
Many applications involve the subclass of near-rings known as near-fields; for these see the article on near-fields.

There are various applications of proper near-rings, i.e., those that are neither rings nor near-fields.

The best known is to balanced incomplete block designs using planar near-rings. These are a way to obtain difference families using the orbits of a fixed-point-free automorphism group of a group. James R. Clay and others have extended these ideas to more general geometrical constructions.

== See also ==
- Near-field (mathematics)
- Semiring
- Near-semiring
