= Lunar arithmetic =

Arithmetic operations

Lunar arithmetic, formerly called dismal arithmetic, is a version of arithmetic in which the addition and multiplication operations on digits are defined as the max and min operations. Thus, in lunar arithmetic,

$2+7=\max\{2,7\}=7$ and $2\times 7 = \min\{2,7\}=2.$

The lunar arithmetic operations on nonnegative multidigit numbers are performed as in usual arithmetic as illustrated in the following examples. The world of lunar arithmetic is restricted to the set of nonnegative integers.

 976 +
 348
 ----
 978 (adding digits column-wise)

    976 ×
    348
   ----
   876 (multiplying the digits of 976 by 8)
  444  (multiplying the digits of 976 by 4)
 333   (multiplying the digits of 976 by 3)
 ------
 34876 (adding digits column-wise)

The concept of lunar arithmetic was proposed by David Applegate, Marc LeBrun, and Neil Sloane.

In the general definition of lunar arithmetic, one considers numbers expressed in an arbitrary base $b$ and define lunar arithmetic operations as the max and min operations on the digits corresponding to the chosen base. However, for simplicity, in the following discussion it will be assumed that the numbers are represented using 10 as the base.

== Properties of the lunar operations ==
A few of the elementary properties of the lunar operations are listed below.

1. The lunar addition and multiplication operations satisfy the commutative and associative laws.
2. The lunar multiplication distributes over the lunar addition.
3. The digit 0 is the identity under lunar addition. No non-zero number has an inverse under lunar addition.
4. The digit 9 is the identity under lunar multiplication. No number different from 9 has an inverse under lunar multiplication.

== Some standard sequences ==
=== Even numbers ===
It may be noted that, in lunar arithmetic, $n+n\ne 2\times n$ and $n+n=n$. The even numbers are numbers of the form $2 \times n$. The first few distinct even numbers under lunar arithmetic are listed below:

$$0,1,2,10,11,12,20,21,22,100, 101, 102, 110, 111, 112, 120, 121, 122, \ldots$$

These are the numbers whose digits are all less than or equal to 2.

=== Squares ===
A square number is a number of the form $n\times n$. So in lunar arithmetic, the first few squares are the following.

$$0, 1, 2, 3, 4, 5, 6, 7, 8, 9, 100, 111, 112, 113, 114, 115, 116, 117, 118, 119, 200, \ldots$$

=== Triangular numbers ===
A triangular number is a number of the form $1+2+\cdots+n$. The first few triangular lunar numbers are:

$$0, 1, 2, 3, 4, 5, 6, 7, 8, 9, 19, 19, 19, 19, 19, 19, 19, 19, 19, 19, 29, 29, 29, 29, 29, \ldots$$

=== Factorials ===
In lunar arithmetic, the first few values of the factorial $n!=1\times 2\times \cdots \times n$ are as follows:

$$1, 1, 1, 1, 1, 1, 1, 1, 1, 10, 110, 1110, 11110, 111110, 1111110, \ldots$$

== Prime numbers ==
In the usual arithmetic, a prime number is defined as a number $p$ whose only possible factorisation is $1\times p$. Analogously, in the lunar arithmetic, a prime number is defined as a number $m$ whose only factorisation is $9\times n$ where 9 is the multiplicative identity which corresponds to 1 in usual arithmetic. Accordingly, the following are the first few prime numbers in lunar arithmetic:

$$19, 29, 39, 49, 59, 69, 79, 89, 90, 91, 92, 93, 94, 95, 96, 97, 98, 99, 109, 209, 219,$$
$$309, 319, 329, 409, 419, 429, 439, 509, 519, 529, 539, 549, 609, 619, 629, 639, \dots$$

Every number of the form $10 \ldots ( n\text{ zeros}) \ldots 09$, where $n$ is arbitrary, is a prime in lunar arithmetic. Since $n$ is arbitrary this shows that there are an infinite number of primes in lunar arithmetic.

== Sumsets and lunar multiplication ==
There is an interesting relation between the operation of forming sumsets of subsets of nonnegative integers and lunar multiplication on binary numbers. Let $A$ and $B$ be nonempty subsets of the set $N$ of nonnegative integers. The sumset $A+B$ is defined by

$$A+B=\{a+b:a\in A, \, b\in B\}.$$

To the set $A$ we can associate a unique binary number $\beta(A)$ as follows. Let $m=\max(A)$. For $i=0,1,\ldots,m$ we define

$$b_i=\begin{cases} 1& \text{if } i\in A\\ 0 &\text{if } i\notin A\end{cases}$$

and then we define

$$\beta(A)=b_mb_{m-1}\ldots b_0.$$

It has been proved that

$\beta(A+B)=\beta(A)\times\beta(B)$ where the "$\times$" on the right denotes the lunar multiplication on binary numbers.

== Magic squares of squares using lunar arithmetic ==
A magic square of squares is a magic square formed by squares of numbers. It is not known whether there are any magic squares of squares of order 3 with the usual addition and multiplication of integers. However, it has been observed that, if we consider the lunar arithmetic operations, there are an infinite amount of magic squares of squares of order 3. Here is an example:

$$\begin{matrix}44^2 & 38^2 & 45^2\\ 46^2&0^2&28^2\\ 18^2 &47^2 &8^2\end{matrix}$$

== See also ==
- Tropical arithmetic
