= Tropical geometry =

Skeletonized version of algebraic geometry

A tropical cubic curve

In mathematics, tropical geometry is the study of polynomials and their geometric properties when addition is replaced with minimization and multiplication is replaced with ordinary addition:

$$x\oplus y=\min\{x,y\}$$,
$$x\otimes y=x+y$$.

So for example, the classical polynomial $x^3+xy+y^4$ would become $\min\{x+x+x,\;x+y,\;y+y+y+y\}$. Such polynomials and their solutions have important applications in optimization problems, for example, the problem of optimizing departure times for a network of trains.

Tropical geometry is a variant of algebraic geometry in which polynomial graphs resemble piecewise linear meshes, and in which numbers belong to the tropical semiring instead of a field. Because classical and tropical geometry are closely related, results and methods can be converted between them. Algebraic varieties can be mapped to a tropical counterpart and, since this process still retains some geometric information about the original variety, it can be used to help prove and generalize classical results from algebraic geometry, such as the Brill–Noether theorem or computing Gromov–Witten invariants, using the tools of tropical geometry.

== History ==
The basic ideas of tropical analysis were developed independently using the same notation by mathematicians working in various fields. The central ideas of tropical geometry appeared in different forms in a number of earlier works. For example, Victor Pavlovich Maslov introduced a tropical version of the process of integration. He also noticed that the Legendre transformation and solutions of the Hamilton–Jacobi equation are linear operations in the tropical sense. However, only since the late 1990s has an effort been made to consolidate the basic definitions of the theory. This was motivated by its application to enumerative algebraic geometry, with ideas from Maxim Kontsevich and works by Grigory Mikhalkin among others.

The adjective tropical was coined by French mathematicians in honor of the Hungarian-born Brazilian computer scientist Imre Simon, who wrote on the field. Jean-Éric Pin attributes the coinage to Dominique Perrin, whereas Simon himself attributes the word to Christian Choffrut.

== Algebra background ==
Tropical geometry is based on the tropical semiring. This is defined in two ways, depending on max or min convention.

The min tropical semiring $\mathbb{T}$ is the semiring $\mathbb{T}=(\R\cup\{+\infty\},\oplus,\otimes)$, with the operations:

$$x\oplus y=\min\{x,y\}$$,
$$x\otimes y=x+y$$.

The operations $\oplus$ and $\otimes$ are referred to as tropical addition and tropical multiplication respectively. The identity element for $\oplus$ is $+\infty$, and the identity element for $\otimes$ is 0.

Similarly, the max tropical semiring $\mathbb{T}$ is the semiring $\mathbb{T}=(\R\cup\{-\infty\},\oplus,\otimes)$, with operations:

$$x\oplus y=\max\{x,y\}$$,
$$x\otimes y=x+y$$.

The identity element for $\oplus$ is $-\infty$, and the identity element for $\otimes$ is 0.

These semirings are isomorphic, under negation $x \mapsto -x$, and generally one of these is chosen and referred to simply as the tropical semiring. Conventions differ between authors and subfields: some use the min convention, some use the max convention.

The tropical semiring operations model how valuations behave under addition and multiplication in a valued field.

Some common valued fields encountered in tropical geometry (with min convention) are:

- $\Q$ or $\Complex$ with the trivial valuation, $v(a)=0$ for all $a\ne0$.
- $\Q$ or its extensions with the p-adic valuation, $v_p(p^n a/b)=n$ for a and b coprime to p.
- The field of Laurent series $\Complex(\!(t)\!)$ (integer powers), or the field of (complex) Puiseux series $\Complex\{\!\{t\}\!\}$, with valuation returning the smallest exponent of t appearing in the series.

== Tropical polynomials ==
A tropical polynomial is a function $F:\R^n\to\R$ that can be expressed as the tropical sum of a finite number of monomial terms. A monomial term is a tropical product (and/or quotient) of a constant and variables from $X_1,\ldots,X_n$. Thus a tropical polynomial $F$ is the minimum of a finite collection of affine-linear functions in which the variables have integer coefficients, so it is concave, continuous, and piecewise linear.

$$\begin{align}F(X_1,\ldots,X_n)&=\left(C_1\otimes X_1^{\otimes a_{11}}\otimes\cdots\otimes X_n^{\otimes a_{n1}}\right)\oplus\cdots\oplus\left(C_s\otimes X_1^{\otimes a_{1s}}\otimes\cdots\otimes X_n^{\otimes a_{ns}}\right)\\&=\min\{C_1+a_{11}X_1+\cdots+a_{n1}X_n,\;\ldots,\;C_s+a_{1s}X_1+\cdots+a_{ns}X_n\}\end{align}$$

Given a polynomial $f$ in the Laurent polynomial ring $K[x_1^{\pm 1},\ldots,x_n^{\pm1}]$ where $K$ is a valued field, the tropicalization of $f$, denoted $\operatorname{Trop}(f)$, is the tropical polynomial obtained from $f$ by replacing multiplication and addition by their tropical counterparts and each constant in $K$ by its valuation. That is, if

$$f=\sum_{i=1}^s c_i x^{A_i}\quad \text{with }A_1,\ldots,A_s\in\Z^n$$,

then

$$\operatorname{Trop}(f)=\bigoplus_{i=1}^s v(c_i)\otimes X^{\otimes A_i}$$.

The set of points where a tropical polynomial $F$ is non-differentiable is called its associated tropical hypersurface, denoted $\mathrm{V}(F)$ (in analogy to the vanishing set of a polynomial). Equivalently, $\mathrm{V}(F)$ is the set of points where the minimum among the terms of $F$ is achieved at least twice. When $F=\operatorname{Trop}(f)$ for a Laurent polynomial $f$, this latter characterization of $\mathrm{V}(F)$ reflects the fact that at any solution to $f=0$, the minimum valuation of the terms of $f$ must be achieved at least twice in order for them all to cancel.

== Tropical varieties ==
=== Definitions ===
For X an algebraic variety in the algebraic torus $(K^{\times})^n$, the tropical variety of X or tropicalization of X, denoted $\operatorname{Trop}(X)$, is a subset of $\R^n$ that can be defined in several ways. The equivalence of these definitions is referred to as the Fundamental Theorem of Tropical Geometry.

==== Intersection of tropical hypersurfaces ====
Let $\mathrm{I}(X)$ be the ideal of Laurent polynomials that vanish on X in $K[x_1^{\pm 1},\ldots,x_n^{\pm1}]$. Define

$$\operatorname{Trop}(X)=\bigcap_{f\in\mathrm{I}(X)}\mathrm{V}(\operatorname{Trop}(f))\subseteq\R^n$$

When X is a hypersurface, its vanishing ideal $\mathrm{I}(X)$ is a principal ideal generated by a Laurent polynomial f, and the tropical variety $\operatorname{Trop}(X)$ is precisely the tropical hypersurface $\mathrm{V}(\operatorname{Trop}(f))$.

Every tropical variety is the intersection of a finite number of tropical hypersurfaces. A finite set of polynomials $\{f_1,\ldots,f_r\}\subseteq\mathrm{I}(X)$ is called a tropical basis for X if $\operatorname{Trop}(X)$ is the intersection of the tropical hypersurfaces of $\operatorname{Trop}(f_1),\ldots,\operatorname{Trop}(f_r)$. In general, a generating set of $\mathrm{I}(X)$ is not sufficient to form a tropical basis. The intersection of a finite number of a tropical hypersurfaces is called a tropical prevariety and in general is not a tropical variety.

==== Initial ideals ====
Choosing a vector $\mathbf{w}$ in $\R^n$ defines a map from the monomial terms of $K[x_1^{\pm 1},\ldots,x_n^{\pm1}]$ to $\R$ by sending the term m to $\operatorname{Trop}(m)(\mathbf{w})$. For a Laurent polynomial $f=m_1+\cdots+m_s$, define the initial form of f to be the sum of the terms $m_i$ of f for which $\operatorname{Trop}(m_i)(\mathbf{w})$ is minimal. For the ideal $\mathrm{I}(X)$, define its initial ideal with respect to $\mathbf{w}$ to be

$$\operatorname{in}_{\mathbf{w}}\mathrm{I}(X)=(\operatorname{in}_{\mathbf{w}}(f):f\in\mathrm{I}(X))$$.

Then define

$$\operatorname{Trop}(X) =\{\mathbf{w}\in\R^n:\operatorname{in}_{\mathbf{w}}\mathrm{I}(X)\neq(1)\}$$.

Since we are working in the Laurent ring, this is the same as the set of weight vectors for which $\operatorname{in}_{\mathbf{w}}\mathrm{I}(X)$ does not contain a monomial.

When K has trivial valuation, $\operatorname{in}_{\mathbf{w}}\mathrm{I}(X)$ is precisely the initial ideal of $\mathrm{I}(X)$ with respect to the monomial order given by a weight vector $\mathbf{w}$. It follows that $\operatorname{Trop}(X)$ is a subfan of the Gröbner fan of $\mathrm{I}(X)$.

==== Image of the valuation map ====
Suppose that X is a variety over a field K with valuation v whose image is dense in $\R$ (for example a field of Puiseux series). By acting coordinate-wise, v defines a map from the algebraic torus $(K^{\times})^n$ to $\R^n$. Then define

$$\operatorname{Trop}(X)=\overline{\{(v(x_1),\ldots,v(x_n)):(x_1,\ldots,x_n)\in X\}}$$,

where the overline indicates the closure in the Euclidean topology. If the valuation of K is not dense in $\R$, then the above definition can be adapted by extending scalars to larger field which does have a dense valuation.

This definition shows that $\operatorname{Trop}(X)$ is the non-Archimedean amoeba over an algebraically closed non-Archimedean field K.

If X is a variety over $\Complex$, $\operatorname{Trop}(X)$ can be considered as the limiting object of the amoeba $\operatorname{Log}_t(X)$ as the base t of the logarithm map goes to infinity (see also Log semiring).

==== Polyhedral complex ====
The following characterization describes tropical varieties intrinsically without reference to algebraic varieties and tropicalization. A set V in $\R^n$ is an irreducible tropical variety if it is the support of a weighted polyhedral complex of pure dimension d that satisfies the zero-tension condition and is connected in codimension one. When d is one, the zero-tension condition means that around each vertex, the weighted-sum of the out-going directions of edges equals zero. For higher dimension, sums are taken instead around each cell of dimension $d-1$ after quotienting out the affine span of the cell. The property that V is connected in codimension one means for any two points lying on dimension d cells, there is a path connecting them that does not pass through any cells of dimension less than $d-1$.

=== Tropical curves ===
The study of tropical curves (tropical varieties of dimension one) is particularly well developed and is strongly related to graph theory. For instance, the theory of divisors of tropical curves are related to chip-firing games on graphs associated to the tropical curves.

Many classical theorems of algebraic geometry have counterparts in tropical geometry, including:

- Pappus's hexagon theorem.
- Bézout's theorem.
- The degree-genus formula.
- The Riemann–Roch theorem.
- The group law of the cubics.

Oleg Viro used tropical curves to classify real curves of degree 7 in the plane up to isotopy. His method of patchworking gives a procedure to build a real curve of a given isotopy class from its tropical curve.

== Applications ==
A tropical line appeared in Paul Klemperer's design of auctions used by the Bank of England during the financial crisis in 2007. Yoshinori Shiozawa defined subtropical algebra as max-times or min-times semiring (instead of max-plus and min-plus). He found that Ricardian trade theory (international trade without input trade) can be interpreted as a subtropical convex algebra. Tropical geometry has also been used for analyzing neural networks. One such result is that feedforward neural networks with ReLU activation are exactly tropical rational curves.

Moreover, several optimization problems arising for instance in job scheduling, location analysis, transportation networks, decision making and discrete event dynamical systems can be formulated and solved in the framework of tropical geometry. A tropical counterpart of the Abel–Jacobi map can be applied to a crystal design. The weights in a weighted finite-state transducer are often required to be a tropical semiring. Tropical geometry can show self-organized criticality.

Tropical geometry has also found applications in several topics within theoretical high energy physics. In particular, tropical geometry has been used to drastically simplify string theory amplitudes to their field-theoretical limits and has found connections to constructions such as the Amplituhedron and tropological (topological Carrollian) sigma models.

Tropical geometry has also found applications in phylogenetics. The space of phylogenetic trees forms a tropical linear space, which is tropically convex. This connection has motivated research into statistical methods on tree spaces, including non-parametric approaches to finding consensus trees based on tropical optimization.

== See also ==
- Tropical analysis
- Tropical compactification
