= Multiple rule-based problems =

Multiple rule-based problems are problems containing various conflicting rules and restrictions. Such problems typically have an "optimal" solution, found by striking a balance between the various restrictions, without directly defying any of the aforementioned restrictions.

Solutions to such problems can either require complex, non-linear thinking processes, or can instead require mathematics-based solutions in which an optimal solution is found by setting the various restrictions as equations, and finding an appropriate maximum value when all equations are added. These problems may thus require more working information as compared to causal relationship problem solving or single rule-based problem solving. The multiple rule-based problem solving is more likely to increase cognitive load than are the other two types of problem solving.
