= Tropical semiring =

Semiring with minimum and addition replacing addition and multiplication

In idempotent analysis, the tropical semiring is a semiring of extended real numbers with the operations of minimum (or maximum) and addition replacing the usual ("classical") operations of addition and multiplication, respectively.

The tropical semiring has various applications (see tropical analysis), and forms the basis of tropical geometry. The name tropical is a reference to the Hungarian-born computer scientist Imre Simon, so named because he lived and worked in Brazil.

== Definition ==
The min tropical semiring (or min-plus semiring or min-plus algebra) is the semiring (or semifield) ($\mathbb{R} \cup \{+\infty\}$, $\oplus$, $\otimes$), with the operations:

$$x \oplus y = \min\{x, y \},$$
$$x \otimes y = x + y.$$

The operations $\oplus$ and $\otimes$ are referred to as tropical addition and tropical multiplication respectively. The identity element for $\oplus$ is $+\infty$, and the identity element for $\otimes$ is 0.

Similarly, the max tropical semiring (or max-plus semiring or max-plus algebra or arctic semiring) is the semiring ($\mathbb{R} \cup \{-\infty\}$, $\oplus$, $\otimes$), with operations:

$$x \oplus y = \max\{x, y \},$$
$$x \otimes y = x + y.$$

The identity element unit for $\oplus$ is $-\infty$, and the identity element unit for $\otimes$ is 0.

The two semirings are isomorphic under negation $x \mapsto -x$, and generally one of these is chosen and referred to simply as the tropical semiring. Conventions differ between authors and subfields: some use the min convention, some use the max convention.

The two tropical semirings are the limit ("tropicalization", "dequantization") of the log semiring as the base goes to infinity $b \to \infty$ (max-plus semiring) or to zero $b \to 0$ (min-plus semiring).

Tropical addition is idempotent, thus a tropical semiring is an example of an idempotent semiring.

A tropical semiring is also referred to as a tropical algebra, though this should not be confused with an associative algebra over a tropical semiring.

Tropical exponentiation is defined in the usual way as iterated tropical products.

== Valued fields ==
The tropical semiring operations model how valuations behave under addition and multiplication in a valued field. A real-valued field $K$ is a field equipped with a function

$$v:K \to \R \cup \{\infty\}$$

which satisfies the following properties for all $a$, $b$ in $K$:

$v(a) = \infty$ if and only if $a = 0,$
$$v(ab) = v(a) + v(b) = v(a) \otimes v(b),$$
$v(a + b) \geq \min\{v(a), v(b) \} = v(a) \oplus v(b),$ with equality if $v(a) \neq v(b).$

Therefore the valuation v is almost a semiring homomorphism from K to the tropical semiring, except that the homomorphism property can fail when two elements with the same valuation are added together.

Some common valued fields:

- $\Q$ or $\C$ with the trivial valuation, $v(a)=0$ for all $a\neq 0$,
- $\Q$ with the p-adic valuation, $v(p^na/b)=n$ for $a,b\ne0$ and coprime to $p$,
- a non-Archimedean local field, such as the p-adic numbers $\Q_p$ with the p-adic valuation extending the one on $\Q$,
- the field of formal Laurent series $K((t))$ (integer powers), or the field of Puiseux series $K\{\{t\}\}$, or the field of Hahn series, with valuation returning the smallest exponent of $t$ appearing in the series.
