= Semiring =

Algebraic ring that need not have additive negative elements

In abstract algebra, a semiring is an algebraic structure. Semirings are a generalization of rings, dropping the requirement that each element must have an additive inverse. At the same time, semirings are a generalization of bounded distributive lattices.

The smallest semiring that is not a ring is the two-element Boolean algebra, for instance with logical disjunction $\lor$ as addition. A motivating example that is neither a ring nor a lattice is the set of natural numbers $\N$ (including zero) under ordinary addition and multiplication. Semirings are abundant because a suitable multiplication operation arises as the function composition of endomorphisms over any commutative monoid.

== Terminology ==
Some authors define semirings without the requirement for there to be a $0$ or $1$. This makes the analogy between ring and semiring on the one hand and group and semigroup on the other hand work more smoothly. These authors often use rig for the concept defined here. (Note: For an example see the definition of rig on Proofwiki.org) This originated as a joke, suggesting that rigs are rings without negative elements. (Akin to using rng to mean a ring without a multiplicative identity.)

The term dioid (for "double monoid") has been used to mean semirings or other structures. It was used by Kuntzmann in 1972 to denote a semiring. (It is alternatively sometimes used for naturally ordered semirings (Note: Semirings for breakfast, slide 17) but the term was also used for idempotent subgroups by Baccelli et al. in 1992.)

== Definition ==
A semiring is a set $R$ equipped with two binary operations $+$ and $\cdot,$ called addition and multiplication, such that:

- $(R, +)$ is a commutative monoid with an identity element called $0$:
  - $(a + b) + c = a + (b + c)$
  - $0 + a = a$
  - $a + 0 = a$
  - $a + b = b + a$
- $(R, \,\cdot\,)$ is a monoid with an identity element called $1$:
  - $(a \cdot b) \cdot c = a \cdot (b \cdot c)$
  - $1 \cdot a = a$
  - $a \cdot 1 = a$

Further, the following axioms tie to both operations:

- Through multiplication, any element is left- and right-annihilated by the additive identity:
  - $0 \cdot a = 0$
  - $a \cdot 0 = 0$
- Multiplication left- and right-distributes over addition:
  - $a \cdot (b + c) = (a \cdot b) + (a \cdot c)$
  - $(b + c) \cdot a = (b \cdot a) + (c \cdot a)$

=== Notation ===
The symbol $\cdot$ is usually omitted from the notation; that is, $a \cdot b$ is just written $ab.$

Similarly, an order of operations is conventional, in which $\cdot$ is applied before $+$. That is, $a + b\cdot c$ denotes $a + (b\cdot c)$.

For the purpose of disambiguation, one may write $0_R$ or $1_R$ to emphasize which structure the units at hand belong to.

If $x\in R$ is an element of a semiring and $n\in{\mathbb N}$, then $n$-times repeated multiplication of $x$ with itself is denoted $x^n$, and one similarly writes $n\,x:=x+x+\cdots+x$ for the $n$-times repeated addition.

== Construction of new semirings ==
The zero ring with underlying set $\{0\}$ is a semiring called the trivial semiring. This triviality can be characterized via $0=1$ and so when speaking of nontrivial semirings, $0\neq 1$ is often silently assumed as if it were an additional axiom. Now given any semiring, there are several ways to define new ones.

As noted, the natural numbers ${\mathbb N}$ with its arithmetic structure form a semiring. Taking the zero and the image of the successor operation in a semiring $R$, i.e., the set $\{x\in R\mid x=0_R\lor \exists p \in R. x = p + 1_R\}$ together with the inherited operations, is always a sub-semiring of $R$.

If $(M, +)$ is a commutative monoid, function composition provides the multiplication to form a semiring: The set $\operatorname{End}(M)$ of endomorphisms $M \to M$ forms a semiring where addition is defined from pointwise addition in $M$. The zero morphism and the identity are the respective neutral elements. If $M = R^n$ with $R$ a semiring, we obtain a semiring that can be associated with the square $n\times n$ matrices ${\mathcal M}_n(R)$ with coefficients in $R$, the matrix semiring using ordinary addition and multiplication rules of matrices. Given $n\in{\mathbb N}$ and $R$ a semiring, ${\mathcal M}_n(R)$ is always a semiring also. It is generally non-commutative even if $R$ was commutative.

Dorroh extensions: If $R$ is a semiring, then $R\times{\mathbb N}$ with pointwise addition and multiplication given by $\langle x,n\rangle\bullet \langle y,m\rangle:=\langle x\cdot y+(x\,m+y\,n), n\cdot m\rangle$ defines another semiring with multiplicative unit $1_{R\times{\mathbb N}}:=\langle 0_R,1_{\mathbb N}\rangle$. Very similarly, if $N$ is any sub-semiring of $R$, one may also define a semiring on $R\times N$, just by replacing the repeated addition in the formula by multiplication. Indeed, these constructions even work under looser conditions, as the structure $R$ is not actually required to have a multiplicative unit.

Zerosumfree semirings are in a sense furthest away from being rings. Given a semiring, one may adjoin a new zero $0'$ to the underlying set and thus obtain such a zerosumfree semiring that also lacks zero divisors. In particular, now $0\cdot 0'=0'$ and the old semiring is actually not a sub-semiring. One may then go on and adjoin new elements "on top" one at a time, while always respecting the zero. These two strategies also work under looser conditions. Sometimes the notations $-\infty$ resp. $+\infty$ are used when performing these constructions.

Adjoining a new zero to the trivial semiring, in this way, results in another semiring which may be expressed in terms of the logical connectives of disjunction and conjunction: $\langle\{0,1\},+,\cdot,\langle 0,1\rangle\rangle=\langle\{\bot,\top\},\lor,\land,\langle\bot,\top\rangle\rangle$. Consequently, this is the smallest semiring that is not a ring. Explicitly, it violates the ring axioms as $\top\lor P = \top$ for all $P$, i.e. $1$ has no additive inverse. In the self-dual definition, the fault is with $\bot\land P = \bot$. (This is not to be conflated with the ring $\Z_2$, whose addition functions as xor $\veebar$.) In the von Neumann model of the naturals, $0_\omega:=\{\}$, $1_\omega:=\{0_\omega\}$ and $2_\omega:=\{0_\omega,1_\omega\}={\mathcal P}1_\omega$. The two-element semiring may be presented in terms of the set theoretic union and intersection as $\langle {\mathcal P}1_\omega,\cup,\cap,\langle \{\},1_\omega\rangle\rangle$. Now this structure in fact still constitutes a semiring when $1_\omega$ is replaced by any inhabited set whatsoever.

The ideals on a semiring $R$, with their standard operations on subset, form a lattice-ordered, simple and zerosumfree semiring. The ideals of ${\mathcal M}_n(R)$ are in bijection with the ideals of $R$. The collection of left ideals of $R$ (and likewise the right ideals) also have much of that algebraic structure, except that then $R$ does not function as a two-sided multiplicative identity.

If $R$ is a semiring and $A$ is an inhabited set, $A^*$ denotes the free monoid and the formal polynomials $R[A^*]$ over its words form another semiring. For small sets, the generating elements are conventionally used to denote the polynomial semiring. For example, in case of a singleton $A=\{X\}$ such that $A^*=\{\varepsilon,X,X^2,X^3,\dots\}$, one writes $R[X]$. Zerosumfree sub-semirings of $R$ can be used to determine sub-semirings of $R[A^*]$.

Given a set $A$, not necessarily just a singleton, adjoining a default element to the set underlying a semiring $R$ one may define the semiring of partial functions from $A$ to $R$.

Given a derivation ${\mathrm d}$ on a semiring $R$, another the operation "$\bullet$" fulfilling $X\bullet y=y\bullet X+{\mathrm d}(y)$ can be defined as part of a new multiplication on $R[X]$, resulting in another semiring.

The above is by no means an exhaustive list of systematic constructions.

=== Derivations ===
Derivations on a semiring $R$ are the maps ${\mathrm d}\colon R\to R$ with ${\mathrm d}(x+y)={\mathrm d}(x)+{\mathrm d}(y)$ and ${\mathrm d}(x\cdot y)={\mathrm d}(x)\cdot y+x\cdot {\mathrm d}(y)$.

For example, if $E$ is the $2\times 2$ unit matrix and $U=\bigl(\begin{smallmatrix}0 & 1 \\ 0 & 0 \end{smallmatrix}\bigr)$, then the subset of ${\mathcal M}_2(R)$ given by the matrices $a\,E + b\,U$ with $a,b\in R$ is a semiring with derivation $a\,E + b\,U\mapsto b\,U$.

== Properties ==
A basic property of semirings is that $1$ is not a left or right zero divisor, and that $1$ but also $0$ squares to itself, i.e. these have $u^2=u$.

Some notable properties are inherited from the monoid structures: The monoid axioms demand unit existence, and so the set underlying a semiring cannot be empty. Also, the 2-ary predicate $x\le_\text{pre}y$ defined as $\exists d. x + d = y$, here defined for the addition operation, always constitutes the right canonical preorder relation. Reflexivity $y\le_\text{pre} y$ is witnessed by the identity. Further, $0\le_\text{pre}y$ is always valid, and so zero is the least element with respect to this preorder. Considering it for the commutative addition in particular, the distinction of "right" may be disregarded. In the non-negative integers $\N$, for example, this relation is anti-symmetric and strongly connected, and thus in fact a (non-strict) total order.

Below, more conditional properties are discussed.

=== Semifields ===
Any field is also a semifield, which in turn is a semiring in which also multiplicative inverses exist.

=== Rings ===
Any field is also a ring, which in turn is a semiring in which also additive inverses exist. Note that a semiring omits such a requirement, i.e., it requires only a commutative monoid, not a commutative group. The extra requirement for a ring itself already implies the existence of a multiplicative zero. This contrast is also why for the theory of semirings, the multiplicative zero must be specified explicitly.

Here $-1$, the additive inverse of $1$, squares to $1$. As additive differences $d=y-x$ always exist in a ring, $x\le_\text{pre}y$ is a trivial binary relation in a ring.

=== Commutative semirings ===
A semiring is called a commutative semiring if also the multiplication is commutative. Its axioms can be stated concisely: It consists of two commutative monoids $\langle +, 0\rangle$ and $\langle \cdot, 1\rangle$ on one set such that $a\cdot 0 = 0$ and $a\cdot (b+c)=a\cdot b + a\cdot c$.

The center of a semiring is a sub-semiring and being commutative is equivalent to being its own center.

The commutative semiring of natural numbers is the initial object among its kind, meaning there is a unique structure preserving map of ${\mathbb N}$ into any commutative semiring.

The bounded distributive lattices are commutative semirings with $2a=a=a^2$ and an order constraint discussed below.

=== Ordered semirings ===
Notions or order can be defined using strict, non-strict or second-order formulations. Additional properties such as commutativity simplify the axioms.

Given a strict total order (also sometimes called linear order, or pseudo-order in a constructive formulation), then by definition, the positive and negative elements fulfill $0<x$ resp. $x<0$. By irreflexivity of a strict order, if $s$ is a left zero divisor, then $s\cdot x < s\cdot y$ is false. The non-negative elements are characterized by $\neg(x<0)$, which is then written $0\le x$.

Generally, the strict total order can be negated to define an associated partial order. The asymmetry of the former manifests as $x<y\to x\le y$. In fact in classical mathematics the latter is a (non-strict) total order and such that $0\le x$ implies $x=0\lor 0<x$. Likewise, given any (non-strict) total order, its negation is irreflexive and transitive, and those two properties found together are sometimes called strict quasi-order. Classically this defines a strict total order – indeed strict total order and total order can there be defined in terms of one another.

Recall that "$\le_\text{pre}$" defined above is trivial in any ring. The existence of rings that admit a non-trivial non-strict order shows that these need not necessarily coincide with "$\le_\text{pre}$".

==== Additively idempotent semirings ====
A semiring in which every element is an additive idempotent, that is, $x+x=x$ for all elements $x$, is called an (additively) idempotent semiring. Establishing $1 + 1 = 1$ suffices. Be aware that sometimes this is just called idempotent semiring, regardless of rules for multiplication.

In such a semiring, $x\le_\text{pre} y$ is equivalent to $x + y = y$ and always constitutes a partial order, here now denoted $x\le y$. In particular, here $x \le 0\leftrightarrow x = 0$. So additively idempotent semirings are zerosumfree and, indeed, the only additively idempotent semiring that has all additive inverses is the trivial ring and so this property is specific to semiring theory. Addition and multiplication respect the ordering in the sense that $x \le y$ implies $x + t \leq y + t$, and furthermore implies $s\cdot x \le s\cdot y$ as well as $x\cdot s \le y\cdot s$, for all $x, y, t$ and $s$.

If $R$ is additively idempotent, then so are the polynomials in $R[X^*]$.

A semiring such that there is a lattice structure on its underlying set is lattice-ordered if the sum coincides with the join, $x + y = x\lor y$, and the product lies beneath the meet $x\cdot y \le x\land y$. The lattice-ordered semiring of ideals of a semiring is not necessarily distributive with respect to the lattice structure.

More strictly than just additive idempotence, a semiring is called simple iff $x+1=1$ for all $x$. Then also $1+1=1$ and $x \le 1$ for all $x$. Here $1$ then functions akin to an additively infinite element. If $R$ is an additively idempotent semiring, then $\{x\in R\mid x+1=1\}$ with the inherited operations is its simple sub-semiring. An example of an additively idempotent semiring that is not simple is the tropical semiring on ${\mathbb R}\cup\{-\infty\}$ with the 2-ary maximum function, with respect to the standard order, as addition. Its simple sub-semiring is trivial.

A c-semiring is an idempotent semiring and with addition defined over arbitrary sets.

An additively idempotent semiring with idempotent multiplication, $x^2=x$, is called additively and multiplicatively idempotent semiring, but sometimes also just idempotent semiring. The commutative, simple semirings with that property are exactly the bounded distributive lattices with unique minimal and maximal element (which then are the units). Heyting algebras are such semirings and the Boolean algebras are a special case.

Further, given two bounded distributive lattices, there are constructions resulting in commutative additively-idempotent semirings, which are more complicated than just the direct sum of structures.

==== Number lines ====
In a model of the ring ${\mathbb R}$, one can define a non-trivial positivity predicate $0<x$ and a predicate $x<y$ as $0<(y-x)$ that constitutes a strict total order, which fulfills properties such as $\neg(x<0 \lor 0<x) \to x=0$, or classically the law of trichotomy. With its standard addition and multiplication, this structure forms the strictly ordered field that is Dedekind-complete. By definition, all first-order properties proven in the theory of the reals are also provable in the decidable theory of the real closed field. For example, here $x < y$ is mutually exclusive with $\exists d. y + d^2 = x$.

But beyond just ordered fields, the four properties listed below are also still valid in many sub-semirings of ${\mathbb R}$, including the rationals, the integers, as well as the non-negative parts of each of these structures. In particular, the non-negative reals, the non-negative rationals and the non-negative integers are such a semirings. The first two properties are analogous to the property valid in the idempotent semirings: Translation and scaling respect these ordered rings, in the sense that addition and multiplication in this ring validate

- $(x<y)\,\to\,x+t<y+t$
- $(x<y\land 0<s)\,\to\,s\cdot x < s\cdot y$

In particular, $(0<y\land 0<s)\to 0 < s\cdot y$ and so squaring of elements preserves positivity.

Take note of two more properties that are always valid in a ring. Firstly, trivially $P\,\to\,x \le_\text{pre} y$ for any $P$. In particular, the positive additive difference existence can be expressed as

- $(x<y)\,\to\,x \le_\text{pre} y$

Secondly, in the presence of a trichotomous order, the non-zero elements of the additive group are partitioned into positive and negative elements, with the inversion operation moving between them. With $(-1)^2=1$, all squares are proven non-negative. Consequently, non-trivial rings have a positive multiplicative unit,

- $0<1$

Having discussed a strict order, it follows that $0\neq 1$ and $1\neq 1+1$, etc.

==== Discretely ordered semirings ====
There are a few conflicting notions of discreteness in order theory. Given some strict order on a semiring, one such notion is given by $1$ being positive and covering $0$, i.e. there being no element $x$ between the units, $\neg(0<x \land x<1)$. Now in the present context, an order shall be called discrete if this is fulfilled and, furthermore, all elements of the semiring are non-negative, so that the semiring starts out with the units.

Denote by ${\mathsf {PA}}^-$ the theory of a commutative, discretely ordered semiring also validating the above four properties relating a strict order with the algebraic structure. All of its models have the model $\N$ as its initial segment and Gödel incompleteness and Tarski undefinability already apply to ${\mathsf {PA}}^-$. The non-negative elements of a commutative, discretely ordered ring always validate the axioms of ${\mathsf {PA}}^-$. So a slightly more exotic model of the theory is given by the positive elements in the polynomial ring ${\mathbb Z}[X]$, with positivity predicate for $p={\textstyle\sum}_{k=0}^n a_k X^k$ defined in terms of the last non-zero coefficient, $0 < p := (0 < a_n)$, and $p < q := (0 < q - p)$ as above. While ${\mathsf {PA}}^-$ proves all $\Sigma_1$-sentences that are true about $\N$, beyond this complexity one can find simple such statements that are independent of ${\mathsf {PA}}^-$. For example, while $\Pi_1$-sentences true about $\N$ are still true for the other model just defined, inspection of the polynomial $X$ demonstrates ${\mathsf {PA}}^-$-independence of the $\Pi_2$-claim that all numbers are of the form $2q$ or $2q+1$ ("odd or even"). Showing that also ${\mathbb Z}[X,Y]/(X^2-2Y^2)$ can be discretely ordered demonstrates that the $\Pi_1$-claim $x^2\neq 2y^2$ for non-zero $x$ ("no rational squared equals $2$") is independent. Likewise, analysis for ${\mathbb Z}[X,Y,Z]/(XZ-Y^2)$ demonstrates independence of some statements about factorization true in $\N$. There are ${\mathsf {PA}}$ characterizations of primality that ${\mathsf {PA}}^-$ does not validate for the number $2$.

In the other direction, from any model of ${\mathsf {PA}}^-$ one may construct an ordered ring, which then has elements that are negative with respect to the order, that is still discrete the sense that $1$ covers $0$. To this end one defines an equivalence class of pairs from the original semiring. Roughly, the ring corresponds to the differences of elements in the old structure, generalizing the way in which the initial ring $\Z$ can be defined from $\N$. This, in effect, adds all the inverses and then the preorder is again trivial in that $\forall x. x\le_\text{pre} 0$.

Beyond the size of the two-element algebra, no simple semiring starts out with the units. Being discretely ordered also stands in contrast to, e.g., the standard ordering on the semiring of non-negative rationals ${\mathbb Q}_{\ge 0}$, which is dense between the units. For another example, ${\mathbb Z}[X]/(2X^2-1)$ can be ordered, but not discretely so.

==== Natural numbers ====
${\mathsf {PA}}^-$ plus mathematical induction gives a theory equivalent to first-order Peano arithmetic ${\mathsf {PA}}$. The theory is also famously not categorical, but $\N$ is of course the intended model. ${\mathsf {PA}}$ proves that there are no zero divisors and it is zerosumfree and so no model of it is a ring.

The standard axiomatization of ${\mathsf {PA}}$ is more concise and the theory of its order is commonly treated in terms of the non-strict "$\le_\text{pre}$". However, just removing the potent induction principle from that axiomatization does not leave a workable algebraic theory. Indeed, even Robinson arithmetic ${\mathsf {Q}}$, which removes induction but adds back the predecessor existence postulate, does not prove the monoid axiom $\forall y. (0 + y = y)$.

=== Complete semirings ===
A complete semiring is a semiring for which the additive monoid is a complete monoid, meaning that it has an infinitary sum operation $\Sigma_I$ for any index set $I$ and that the following (infinitary) distributive laws must hold:

$${\textstyle\sum}_{i \in I}{\left(a \cdot a_i\right)} = a \cdot \left({\textstyle\sum}_{i \in I}{a_i}\right), \qquad {\textstyle\sum}_{i \in I}{\left(a_i \cdot a\right)} = \left({\textstyle\sum}_{i \in I}{a_i}\right) \cdot a.$$

Examples of a complete semiring are the power set of a monoid under union and the matrix semiring over a complete semiring. For commutative, additively idempotent and simple semirings, this property is related to residuated lattices.

==== Continuous semirings ====
A continuous semiring is similarly defined as one for which the addition monoid is a continuous monoid. That is, partially ordered with the least upper bound property, and for which addition and multiplication respect order and suprema. The semiring $\N \cup \{ \infty \}$ with usual addition, multiplication and order extended is a continuous semiring.

Any continuous semiring is complete: this may be taken as part of the definition.

=== Star semirings ===
A star semiring (sometimes spelled starsemiring) or closed semiring is a semiring with an additional unary operator ${}^*$, satisfying

$$a^* = 1 + a a^* = 1 + a^* a.$$

A Kleene algebra is a star semiring with idempotent addition and some additional axioms. They are important in the theory of formal languages and regular expressions.

==== Complete star semirings ====
In a complete star semiring, the star operator behaves more like the usual Kleene star: for a complete semiring we use the infinitary sum operator to give the usual definition of the Kleene star:

$$a^* = {\textstyle\sum}_{j \geq 0}{a^j},$$

where

$$a^j = \begin{cases}
1,                                 & j = 0,\\
a \cdot a^{j-1} = a^{j-1} \cdot a, & j > 0.
\end{cases}$$

Note that star semirings are not related to *-algebra, where the star operation should instead be thought of as complex conjugation.

==== Conway semiring ====
A Conway semiring is a star semiring satisfying the sum-star and product-star equations:

$$\begin{align}
(a + b)^* &= \left(a^* b\right)^* a^*, \\
(ab)^* &= 1 + a(ba)^* b.
\end{align}$$

Every complete star semiring is also a Conway semiring, but the converse does not hold. An example of Conway semiring that is not complete is the set of extended non-negative rational numbers $\Q_{\geq 0} \cup \{ \infty \}$ with the usual addition and multiplication (this is a modification of the example with extended non-negative reals given in this section by eliminating irrational numbers). An iteration semiring is a Conway semiring satisfying the Conway group axioms, associated by John Conway to groups in star-semirings.

== Examples ==
- By definition, any ring and any semifield is also a semiring.
- The non-negative elements of a commutative, discretely ordered ring form a commutative, discretely (in the sense defined above) ordered semiring. This includes the non-negative integers $\N$.
- Also the non-negative rational numbers as well as the non-negative real numbers form commutative, ordered semirings. The latter is called probability semiring. Neither are rings or distributive lattices. These examples also have multiplicative inverses.
- New semirings can conditionally be constructed from existing ones, as described. The extended natural numbers $\N \cup \{ \infty \}$ with addition and multiplication extended so that $0 \cdot \infty = 0$.
- The set of polynomials with natural number coefficients, denoted $\N[x],$ forms a commutative semiring. In fact, this is the free commutative semiring on a single generator $\{ x \}.$ Also polynomials with coefficients in other semirings may be defined, as discussed.
- The non-negative terminating fractions $\tfrac{\N}{b^{\N}} := \left\{ mb^{-n} \mid m, n \in \N \right\}$, in a positional number system to a given base $b\in \N$, form a sub-semiring of the rationals. One has $\tfrac{\N}{b^{\N}} \subseteq \tfrac{\N}{c^{\N}}$‍ if $b$ divides $c$. For $|b| > 1$, the set $\tfrac{\Z_0}{b^{\Z_0}} := \tfrac{\N}{b^{\N}} \cup \left(-\tfrac{\N_0}{b^{\N}}\right)$ is the ring of all terminating fractions to base $b,$ and is dense in $\Q$.
- The log semiring on $\R \cup \{ \pm \infty \}$ with addition given by $x \oplus y = - \log\left(e^{-x} + e^{-y}\right)$ with multiplication $+,$ zero element $+ \infty,$ and unit element $0.$
- Similarly, the max-plus tropical semiring is defined using $\R \cup \{ -\infty \}$ with $\max(a, b)$ serving as semiring addition (identity $- \infty$) and ordinary addition (identity 0) serving as semiring multiplication. Likewise, the min-plus tropical semiring is $\R \cup \{ \infty \},$ and min replaces max as the addition operation. A related version has $\R \cup \{ \pm \infty \}$ as the underlying set. They are an active area of research, linking algebraic varieties with piecewise linear structures.
- The Łukasiewicz semiring: the closed interval $[0, 1]$ with addition of $a$ and $b$ given by taking the maximum of the arguments ($\max(a, b)$) and multiplication of $a$ and $b$ given by $\max(0, a + b - 1)$ appears in multi-valued logic.
- The Viterbi semiring is also defined over the base set $[0, 1]$ and has the maximum as its addition, but its multiplication is the usual multiplication of real numbers. It appears in probabilistic parsing.
- The set of all ideals of a given semiring form a semiring under addition and multiplication of ideals.
- Any bounded, distributive lattice is a commutative, semiring under join and meet. A Boolean algebra is a special case of these. A Boolean ring is also a semiring (indeed, a ring) but it is not idempotent under addition. A Boolean semiring is a semiring isomorphic to a sub-semiring of a Boolean algebra.
- The commutative semiring formed by the two-element Boolean algebra and defined by $1 + 1 = 1$. It is also called the Boolean semiring. Now given two sets $X$ and $Y,$ binary relations between $X$ and $Y$ correspond to matrices indexed by $X$ and $Y$ with entries in the Boolean semiring, matrix addition corresponds to union of relations, and matrix multiplication corresponds to composition of relations.
- Any unital quantale is a semiring under join and multiplication.
- A normal skew lattice in a ring $R$ is a semiring for the operations multiplication and nabla, where the latter operation is defined by $a \mathbin\nabla b = a + b + ba - aba - bab$

More using monoids,

- The construction of semirings $\operatorname{End}(M)$ from a commutative monoid $M$ has been described. As noted, give a semiring $R$, the $n\times n$ matrices form another semiring. For example, the matrices with non-negative entries, ${{\mathcal M}}_n(\N),$ form a matrix semiring.
- Given an alphabet (finite set) Σ, the set of formal languages over $\Sigma$ (subsets of $\Sigma^*$) is a semiring with product induced by string concatenation $L_1 \cdot L_2 = \left\{ w_1 w_2 \mid w_1 \in L_1, w_2 \in L_2 \right\}$ and addition as the union of languages (that is, ordinary union as sets). The zero of this semiring is the empty set (empty language) and the semiring's unit is the language containing only the empty string.
- Generalizing the previous example (by viewing $\Sigma^*$ as the free monoid over $\Sigma$), take $M$ to be any monoid; the power set $\wp(M)$ of all subsets of $M$ forms a semiring under set-theoretic union as addition and set-wise multiplication: $U \cdot V = \{ u \cdot v \mid u \in U,\ v \in V \}.$
- Similarly, if $(M, e, \cdot)$ is a monoid, then the set of finite multisets in $M$ forms a semiring. That is, an element is a function $f \mid M \to \N$; given an element of $M,$ the function tells you how many times that element occurs in the multiset it represents. The additive unit is the constant zero function. The multiplicative unit is the function mapping $e$ to $1,$ and all other elements of $M$ to $0.$ The sum is given by $(f + g)(x) = f(x) + g(x)$ and the product is given by $(fg)(x) = \sum\{ f(y) g(z) \mid y \cdot z = x \}.$

Regarding sets and similar abstractions,

- Given a set $U,$ the set of binary relations over $U$ is a semiring with addition the union (of relations as sets) and multiplication the composition of relations. The semiring's zero is the empty relation and its unit is the identity relation. These relations correspond to the matrix semiring (indeed, matrix semialgebra) of square matrices indexed by $U$ with entries in the Boolean semiring, and then addition and multiplication are the usual matrix operations, while zero and the unit are the usual zero matrix and identity matrix.
- The set of cardinal numbers smaller than any given infinite cardinal form a semiring under cardinal addition and multiplication. The class of all cardinals of an inner model form a (class) semiring under (inner model) cardinal addition and multiplication.
- The family of (isomorphism equivalence classes of) combinatorial classes (sets of countably many objects with non-negative integer sizes such that there are finitely many objects of each size) with the empty class as the zero object, the class consisting only of the empty set as the unit, disjoint union of classes as addition, and Cartesian product of classes as multiplication.
- Isomorphism classes of objects in any distributive category, under coproduct and product operations, form a semiring known as a Burnside rig. (Note: Schanuel S.H. (1991) Negative sets have Euler characteristic and dimension. In: Carboni A., Pedicchio M.C., Rosolini G. (eds) Category Theory. Lecture Notes in Mathematics, vol 1488. Springer, Berlin, Heidelberg) A Burnside rig is a ring if and only if the category is trivial.

=== Star semirings ===
Several structures mentioned above can be equipped with a star operation.

- The aforementioned semiring of binary relations over some base set $U$ in which $R^* = \bigcup_{n \geq 0} R^n$ for all $R\subseteq U \times U.$ This star operation is actually the reflexive and transitive closure of $R$ (that is, the smallest reflexive and transitive binary relation over $U$ containing $R.$).
- The semiring of formal languages is also a complete star semiring, with the star operation coinciding with the Kleene star (for sets/languages).
- The set of non-negative extended reals $[0, \infty]$ together with the usual addition and multiplication of reals is a complete star semiring with the star operation given by $a^* = \tfrac{1}{1 - a}$ for $0 \leq a < 1$ (that is, the geometric series) and $a^* = \infty$ for $a \geq 1.$
- The Boolean semiring with $0^* = 1^* = 1.$ (Note: This is a complete star semiring and thus also a Conway semiring.)
- The semiring on $\N \cup \{ \infty \},$ with extended addition and multiplication, and $0^* = 1, a^* = \infty$ for $a \geq 1.$

== Applications ==
The $(\max, +)$ and $(\min, +)$ tropical semirings on the reals are often used in performance evaluation on discrete event systems. The real numbers then are the "costs" or "arrival time"; the "max" operation corresponds to having to wait for all prerequisites of an events (thus taking the maximal time) while the "min" operation corresponds to being able to choose the best, less costly choice; and + corresponds to accumulation along the same path.

The Floyd–Warshall algorithm for shortest paths can thus be reformulated as a computation over a $(\min, +)$ algebra. Similarly, the Viterbi algorithm for finding the most probable state sequence corresponding to an observation sequence in a hidden Markov model can also be formulated as a computation over a $(\max, \times)$ algebra on probabilities. These dynamic programming algorithms rely on the distributive property of their associated semirings to compute quantities over a large (possibly exponential) number of terms more efficiently than enumerating each of them.

== Generalizations ==
A generalization of semirings does not require the existence of a multiplicative identity, so that multiplication is a semigroup rather than a monoid. Such structures are called hemirings or pre-semirings. A further generalization are left-pre-semirings, which additionally do not require right-distributivity (or right-pre-semirings, which do not require left-distributivity).

Yet a further generalization are near-semirings: in addition to not requiring a neutral element for product, or right-distributivity (or left-distributivity), they do not require addition to be commutative. Just as cardinal numbers form a (class) semiring, so do ordinal numbers form a near-semiring, when the standard ordinal addition and multiplication are taken into account. However, the class of ordinals can be turned into a semiring by considering the so-called natural (or Hessenberg) operations instead.

In category theory, a 2-rig is a category with functorial operations analogous to those of a rig. That the cardinal numbers form a rig can be categorified to say that the category of sets (or more generally, any topos) is a 2-rig.

== See also ==
- Ring of sets – Family closed under unions and relative complements
- Valuation algebra – Algebra describing information processing

== Bibliography ==
- Derniame, Jean Claude; Pair, Claude (1971), Problèmes de cheminement dans les graphes (Path Problems in Graphs), Paris: Dunod
- Baccelli, François; Cohen, Guy; Olsder, Geert Jan; Quadrat, Jean-Pierre (1992), Synchronization and Linearity (online version) (PDF), Wiley, ISBN 0-471-93609-X
- Golan, Jonathan S. (1999) Semirings and their applications. Updated and expanded version of The theory of semirings, with applications to mathematics and theoretical computer science (Longman Sci. Tech., Harlow, 1992, MR 1163371). Kluwer Academic Publishers, Dordrecht. xii+381 pp. ISBN 0-7923-5786-8 MR 1746739
- Berstel, Jean; Perrin, Dominique (1985). Theory of codes. Pure and applied mathematics. Vol. 117. Academic Press. ISBN 978-0-12-093420-1. Zbl 0587.68066.
- Berstel, Jean; Reutenauer, Christophe (2011). Noncommutative rational series with applications. Encyclopedia of Mathematics and Its Applications. Vol. 137. Cambridge: Cambridge University Press. ISBN 978-0-521-19022-0. Zbl 1250.68007.
- Droste, Manfred; Kuich, Werner (2009), "Chapter 1: Semirings and Formal Power Series", Handbook of Weighted Automata, pp. 3–28, doi:10.1007/978-3-642-01492-5_1
- Durrett, Richard (2019). Probability: Theory and Examples (PDF). Cambridge Series in Statistical and Probabilistic Mathematics. Vol. 49 (5th ed.). Cambridge New York, NY: Cambridge University Press. ISBN 978-1-108-47368-2. OCLC 1100115281.
- Folland, Gerald B. (1999), Real Analysis: Modern Techniques and Their Applications (2nd ed.), John Wiley & Sons, ISBN 9780471317166
- Golan, Jonathan S. (1999), Semirings and their Applications, Dordrecht: Kluwer Academic Publishers, doi:10.1007/978-94-015-9333-5, ISBN 0-7923-5786-8, MR 1746739
- Lothaire, M. (2005). Applied combinatorics on words. Encyclopedia of Mathematics and Its Applications. Vol. 105. A collective work by Jean Berstel, Dominique Perrin, Maxime Crochemore, Eric Laporte, Mehryar Mohri, Nadia Pisanti, Marie-France Sagot, Gesine Reinert, Sophie Schbath, Michael Waterman, Philippe Jacquet, Wojciech Szpankowski, Dominique Poulalhon, Gilles Schaeffer, Roman Kolpakov, Gregory Koucherov, Jean-Paul Allouche and Valérie Berthé. Cambridge: Cambridge University Press. ISBN 0-521-84802-4. Zbl 1133.68067.
- Głazek, Kazimierz (2002). A guide to the literature on semirings and their applications in mathematics and information sciences. With complete bibliography. Dordrecht: Kluwer Academic. ISBN 1-4020-0717-5. Zbl 1072.16040.
- Gondran, Michel; Minoux, Michel (2008). Graphs, Dioids and Semirings: New Models and Algorithms. Operations Research/Computer Science Interfaces Series. Vol. 41. Dordrecht: Springer Science & Business Media. ISBN 978-0-387-75450-5. Zbl 1201.16038.
- Pair, Claude (1967), "Sur des algorithmes pour des problèmes de cheminement dans les graphes finis (On algorithms for path problems in finite graphs)", in Rosentiehl (ed.), Théorie des graphes (journées internationales d'études) – Theory of Graphs (international symposium), Rome (Italy), July 1966: Dunod (Paris) et Gordon and Breach (New York)
- Sakarovitch, Jacques (2009). Elements of automata theory. Translated from the French by Reuben Thomas. Cambridge: Cambridge University Press. ISBN 978-0-521-84425-3. Zbl 1188.68177.
