= Lattice multiplication =

Multiplication algorithm

Lattice multiplication, also known as the Italian method, Chinese method, Chinese lattice, gelosia multiplication, sieve multiplication, shabakh, diagonally or Venetian squares, is a method of multiplication that uses a lattice to multiply two multi-digit numbers. It is mathematically identical to the more commonly used long multiplication algorithm, but it breaks the process into smaller steps, which some practitioners find easier to use.

The method had already arisen by medieval times, and has been used for centuries in many different cultures. It is still being taught in certain curricula today.

== The Lattice Method For Whole Numbers ==
A grid is drawn up, and each cell is split diagonally. The two multiplicands of the product to be calculated are written along the top and right side of the lattice, respectively, with one digit per column across the top for the first multiplicand (the number written left to right), and one digit per row down the right side for the second multiplicand (the number written top-down). Then each cell of the lattice is filled in with the product of its column and row digit.

As an example, consider the multiplication of 58 with 213. After writing the multiplicands on the sides, consider each cell, beginning with the top left cell. In this case, the column digit is 5 and the row digit is 2. Write their product, 10, in the cell, with the digit 1 above the diagonal and the digit 0 below the diagonal (see picture for Step 1).

If the simple product lacks a digit in the tens place, simply fill in the tens place with a 0.

Step 1

After all the cells are filled in this manner, the digits in each diagonal are summed, working from the bottom right diagonal to the top left. Each diagonal sum is written where the diagonal ends. If the sum contains more than one digit, the value of the tens place is carried into the next diagonal (see Step 2).

Step 2

Numbers are filled to the left and to the bottom of the grid, and the answer is the numbers read off down (on the left) and across (on the bottom). In the example shown, the result of the multiplication of 58 with 213 is 12354.

Step 3

== The Lattice Method for decimals ==
The lattice technique can also be used to multiply decimal fractions. For example, to multiply 5.8 by 2.13, the process is the same as to multiply 58 by 213 as described in the preceding section. To find the position of the decimal point in the final answer, one can draw a vertical line from the decimal point in 5.8, and a horizontal line from the decimal point in 2.13. (See picture for Step 4.) The grid diagonal through the intersection of these two lines then determines the position of the decimal point in the result. In the example shown, the result of the multiplication of 5.8 and 2.13 is 12.354.

Step 4

== History ==
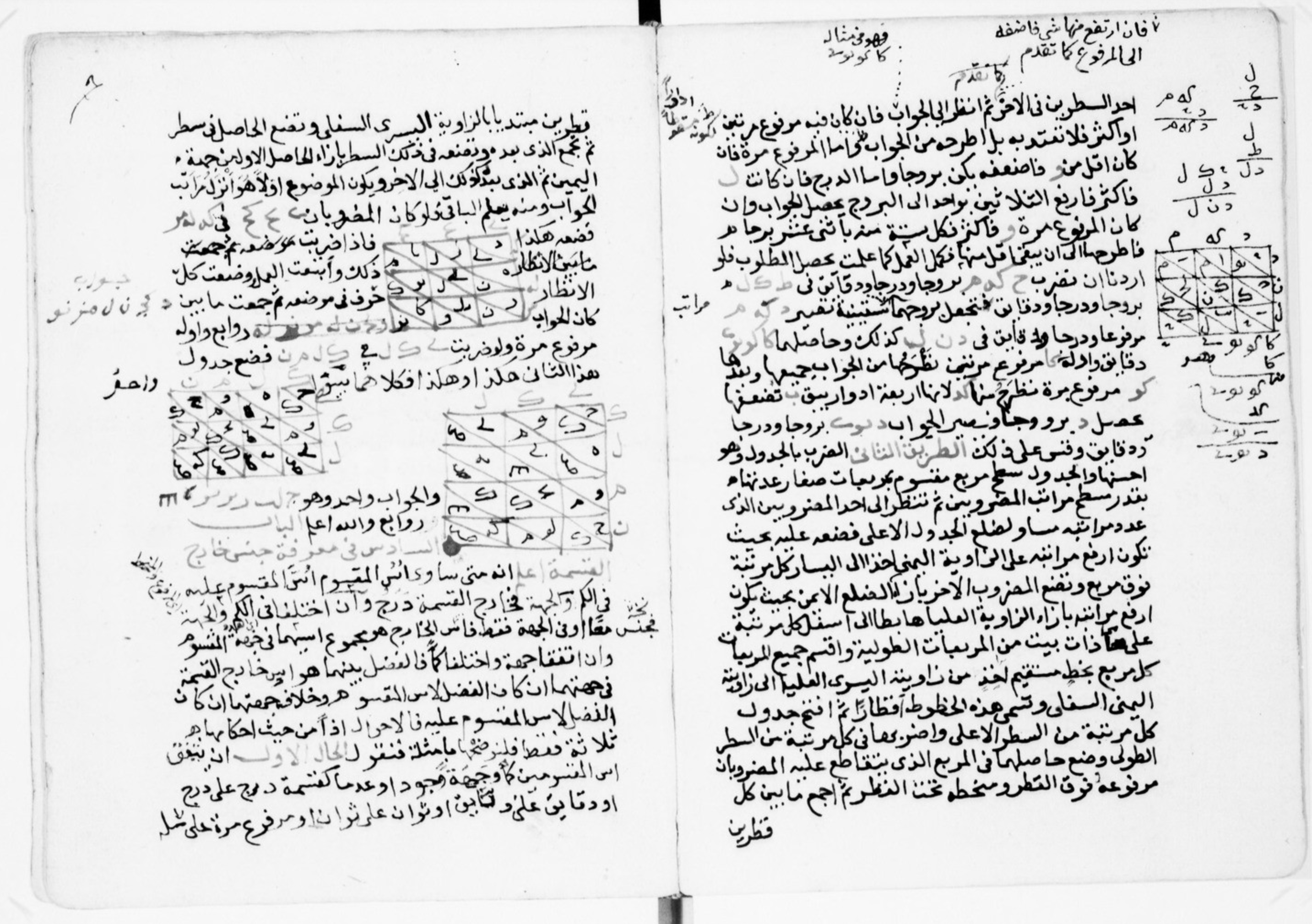
Folios 9v and 10r from the manuscript "Raqāʾiq al-ḥaqāʾiq fī ḥisāb ad-daraj wa-d-daqāʾiq", from the Bibliothèque nationale de France, showing lattice multiplications with old Arab numerals

Though lattice multiplication has been used historically in many cultures, a method called 'Kapat-sandhi' very similar to the lattice method is mentioned in the commentary on 12th century 'Lilavati', a book of Indian mathematics by Bhaskaracharya. It is being researched where it arose first, whether it developed independently within more than one region of the world. The earliest recorded use of lattice multiplication:

- in Arab mathematics was by Ibn al-Banna' al-Marrakushi in his Talkhīṣ a‘māl al-ḥisāb, in the Maghreb in the late 13th century.
- in European mathematics was by the unknown author of a Latin treatise in England, Tractatus de minutis philosophicis et vulgaribus, c. 1300.
- in Chinese mathematics was by Wu Jing in his Jiuzhang suanfa bilei daquan, completed in 1450.

The mathematician and educator David Eugene Smith asserted that lattice multiplication was brought to Italy from the Middle East. This is reinforced by noting that the Arabic term for the method, shabakh, has the same meaning as the Italian term for the method, gelosia, namely, the metal grille or grating (lattice) for a window.

It is sometimes erroneously stated that lattice multiplication was described by Muḥammad ibn Mūsā al-Khwārizmī (Baghdad, c. 825) or by Fibonacci in his Liber Abaci (Italy, 1202, 1228). In fact, however, no use of lattice multiplication by either of these two authors has been found. In Chapter 3 of his Liber Abaci, Fibonacci does describe a related technique of multiplication by what he termed quadrilatero in forma scacherii (“rectangle in the form of a chessboard”). In this technique, the square cells are not subdivided diagonally; only the lowest-order digit is written in each cell, while any higher-order digit must be remembered or recorded elsewhere and then "carried" to be added to the next cell. This is in contrast to lattice multiplication, a distinctive feature of which is that each cell of the rectangle has its own correct place for the carry digit; this also implies that the cells can be filled in any order desired. Swetz compares and contrasts multiplication by gelosia (lattice), by scacherii (chessboard), and other tableau methods.

Other notable historical uses of lattice multiplication include:

- Jamshīd al-Kāshī’s Miftāḥ al-ḥisāb (Samarqand, 1427), in which the numerals used are sexagesimal (base 60), and the grid is turned 45 degrees to a “diamond” orientation
- the Arte dell’Abbaco, an anonymous text published in the Venetian dialect in 1478, often called the Treviso Arithmetic because it was printed in Treviso, just inland from Venice, Italy
- Luca Pacioli’s Summa de arithmetica (Venice, 1494)
- the Indian astronomer Gaṇeśa's commentary on Bhāskara II’s Lilāvati (16th century).

== Derivations ==
Derivations of this method also appeared in the 16th century works Umdet-ul Hisab by Ottoman-Bosnian polymath Matrakçı Nasuh. Matrakçı Nasuh's triangular version of the multiplication technique is seen in the example showing 155 x 525 on the right, and explained in the example showing 236 x 175 on the left figure.

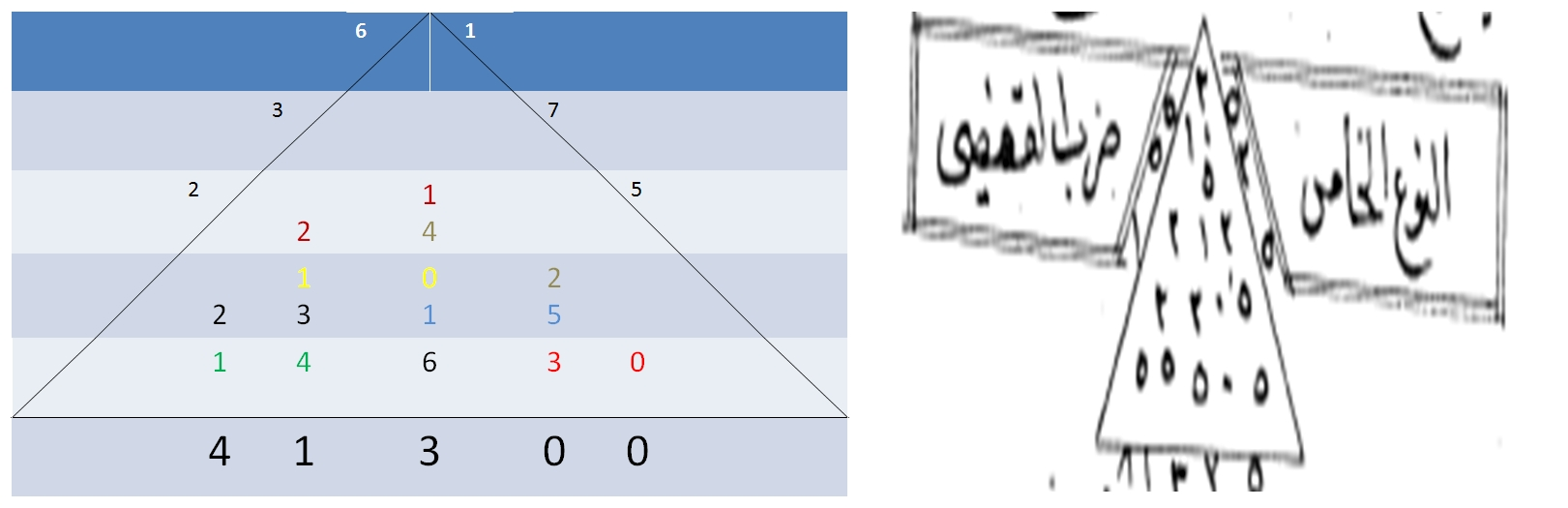

The same principle described by Matrakçı Nasuh underlay the later development of the calculating rods known as Napier's bones (Scotland, 1617) and Genaille–Lucas rulers (France, late 1800s).

== See also ==
- Genaille–Lucas rulers
- Napier's bones
