= Wu Jing =

Wu Jing may refer to:

== People ==
- Wu Jing (Han dynasty) (died 203), military general under the warlord Sun Jian during the late Han dynasty
- Wu Jing (mathematician) (15th century), Ming dynasty mathematician
- Wu Jin (1934–2008), or Wu Jing, Taiwanese educator
- Wu Jing (actress) (born 1949), Chinese actress
- Wu Jing (actor) (born 1974), Chinese actor

== Other uses ==
- Five Classics, or Wu Jing, a collection of ancient Confucian books
- People's Armed Police, or Wu Jing, a paramilitary force of the People's Republic of China

== See also ==
- Wu Ching (disambiguation)
- Wujing (disambiguation)
