= George A. Plimpton =

George A. Plimpton may refer to:

- George Ames Plimpton (1927–2003), American sports writer and journalist
- George Arthur Plimpton (1855–1936), American publisher and grandfather of the former
