= Wujing =

Wujing may refer to:

- Five Classics (五經), five classic Chinese books
- Sha Wujing (沙悟淨), one of the three helpers of Xuánzàng in the classic Chinese novel Journey to the West
- Wujing Zongyao (武經總要, Chinese military compendium written in 1044 AD, during the Northern Song dynasty
- People's Armed Police (武警), a paramilitary force of the People's Republic of China
- Wujing, Fufeng County (午井镇), town in Fufeng County, Baoji, Shaanxi
- Wujing, Nanxiong (乌迳镇), town in Guangdong
- Wujing, Linqu County (五井镇), town in Shandong
- Wujing, Shanghai (吴泾镇), town in Minhang District
- "Wujing" (The Blacklist), 2013 episode of TV series The Blacklist

== See also ==
- Wu Jing (disambiguation)
- Wu Ching (disambiguation)
