= Multiplication =

Arithmetical operation

Four bags with three marbles per bag gives twelve marbles (4 × 3 = 12).

Multiplication can also be thought of as scaling. Here, 2 is being multiplied by 3 using scaling, giving 6 as a result.

Multiplication is one of the four elementary mathematical operations of arithmetic, with the other ones being addition, subtraction, and division. The result of a multiplication operation is called a product. Multiplication is often denoted by the cross symbol, ×, by the mid-line dot operator, ⋅, by juxtaposition, or, in programming languages, by an asterisk, *.

The multiplication of whole numbers may be thought of as repeated addition; that is, the multiplication of two numbers is equivalent to adding as many copies of one of them, the multiplicand, as the quantity of the other one, the multiplier. Both numbers can be referred to as factors. This is to be distinguished from terms, which are added.
$$a\times b = \underbrace{b + \cdots + b}_{a \text{ times}}  .$$

Whether the first factor is the multiplier or the multiplicand may be ambiguous or depend upon context. For example, the expression $3 \times 4$ can be phrased as "3 times 4", or "Three groups of four", notating the multiplication symbol with the word of, and evaluated as $4+4+4$, where 3 is the multiplier, but also as "3 multiplied by 4", in which case 3 becomes the multiplicand and is therefore interpreted as $3+3+3+3$. One of the main properties of multiplication is the commutative property, which states in this case that adding 3 copies of 4 gives the same result as adding 4 copies of 3. Thus, the designation of multiplier and multiplicand does not affect the result of the multiplication.

Systematic generalizations of this basic definition define the multiplication of integers (including negative numbers), rational numbers (fractions), and real numbers.

Multiplication can also be visualized as counting objects arranged in a rectangle (for whole numbers) or as calculating the area of a rectangle with sides of given lengths. The area of a rectangle remains the same regardless of which side is measured first—a result of the commutative property.

The product of two measurements (or physical quantities) is a new type of measurement (or new quantity), usually with a derived unit of measurement. For example, multiplying the lengths (in meters or feet) of the two sides of a rectangle gives its area (in square meters or square feet). Such a product is the subject of dimensional analysis.

The inverse operation of multiplication is considered division. For example, since 4 multiplied by 3 equals 12, 12 divided by 3 equals 4. Indeed, multiplication by 3, followed by division by 3, yields the original number. The division of a number other than 0 by itself equals 1.

Several mathematical concepts expand upon the fundamental idea of multiplication. The product of a sequence, vector multiplication, complex numbers, and matrices are all examples where this can be seen. These more advanced constructs tend to affect the basic properties in their own ways, such as becoming noncommutative in matrices and some forms of vector multiplication or changing the sign of complex numbers.

== Notation ==
In arithmetic, multiplication is often written using the multiplication sign (either × or $\times$) between the factors (that is, in infix notation). For example,

- $2\times 3 = 6,$ ("two times three equals six")
- $3\times 4 = 12 ,$
- $2\times 3\times 5 = 6\times 5 = 30,$
- $2\times 2\times 2\times 2 \times 2 = 32.$

The cross sign was first used by Edward Wright in 1618. There are other mathematical notations for multiplication:

- Multiplication is also denoted by a middle-position dot: $5 \cdot 2$. Middle dot was first used by G. W. Leibniz in 1698, because the multiplication sign × is easily confused with the common mathematical variable x. The middle dot notation, or dot operator, is now standard in the United States and other countries. When the dot operator character is not accessible, the interpunct (·) is used. In most European and other countries that use a comma as a decimal point (and a period as a thousands separator), the multiplication sign or a middle dot is used to indicate multiplication. Historically, in the United Kingdom and Ireland, the middle dot was sometimes used for the decimal point to prevent it from disappearing in the ruled line, and the full stop (period) was used for multiplication. However, since the Ministry of Technology ruled in 1968 that the period be used as the decimal point, and the International System of Units (SI) standard has since been widely adopted, this usage is now found only in the more traditional journals such as The Lancet.
- In algebra, multiplication involving variables is often written as a juxtaposition (e.g., $xy$ for $x$ times $y$ or $5x$ for five times $x$), also called implied multiplication. The notation can also be used for quantities that are surrounded by parentheses (e.g., $5(2)$, $(5)2$ or $(5)(2)$ for five times two). This implicit usage of multiplication can cause ambiguity when the concatenated variables happen to match the name of another variable, when a variable name in front of a parenthesis can be confused with a function name, or in the correct determination of the order of operations.
- In vector multiplication, there is a distinction between the cross and the dot symbols. The cross symbol generally denotes taking a cross product of two vectors, yielding a vector as its result, while the dot denotes taking the dot product of two vectors, resulting in a scalar.

In computer programming, the asterisk (as in 5*2) is still the most common notation. This is because most computers historically were limited to small character sets (such as ASCII and EBCDIC) that lacked a multiplication sign (such as × or ⋅), while the asterisk appeared on every keyboard. This usage originated in the FORTRAN programming language. (Even modern compilers do not recognize × or ⋅ as multiplication operators.)

The numbers to be multiplied are generally called the factors (as in factorization). The number to be multiplied is the multiplicand, and the number by which it is multiplied is the multiplier. Usually, the multiplier is placed first, and the multiplicand is placed second; however, sometimes the first factor is considered the multiplicand and the second the multiplier. Also, as the result of multiplication does not depend on the order of the factors, the distinction between multiplicand and multiplier is useful only at a very elementary level and in some multiplication algorithms, such as the long multiplication. Therefore, in some sources, the term multiplicand is regarded as a synonym for factor. In algebra, a number that is the multiplier of a variable or expression (e.g., the 3 in $3xy^2$) is called a coefficient.

The result of a multiplication is called a product. When one factor is an integer, the product is a multiple of the other or of the product of the others. Thus, $2\times \pi$ is a multiple of $\pi$, as is $5133 \times 486 \times \pi$. A product of integers is a multiple of each factor; for example, 15 is the product of 3 and 5 and is both a multiple of 3 and a multiple of 5.

== Definitions ==
The product of two numbers or the multiplication between two numbers can be defined for common special cases: natural numbers, integers, rational numbers, real numbers, complex numbers, and quaternions.

=== Product of two natural numbers ===
3 by 4 is 12.

The product of two natural numbers $r,s\in\mathbb{N}$ is defined as:

$$r \cdot s \equiv \sum_{i=1}^s r = \underbrace{ r+r+\cdots+r }_{s\text{ times}} \equiv \sum_{j=1}^r s = \underbrace{ s+s+\cdots+s }_{r\text{ times}} .$$

=== Product of two integers ===
An integer can be either zero, a nonzero natural number, or minus a nonzero natural number. The product of zero and another integer is always zero. The product of two nonzero integers is determined by the product of their positive amounts, combined with the sign derived from the following rule:

×	+	−
+	+	−
−	−	+

(This rule is a consequence of the distributivity of multiplication over addition, and is not an additional rule.)

In words:

- A positive number multiplied by a positive number is positive (product of natural numbers),
- A positive number multiplied by a negative number is negative,
- A negative number multiplied by a positive number is negative,
- A negative number multiplied by a negative number is positive.

=== Product of two fractions ===
Two fractions can be multiplied by multiplying their numerators and denominators:

$$\frac{z}{n} \cdot \frac{z'}{n'} = \frac{z\cdot z'}{n\cdot n'} ,$$
which is defined when $n,n'\neq 0$.

=== Product of two real numbers ===
There are several equivalent ways to define the real numbers formally; see Construction of the real numbers. The definition of multiplication is a part of all these definitions.

A fundamental aspect of these definitions is that every real number can be approximated to any accuracy by rational numbers. A standard way for expressing this is that every real number is the least upper bound of a set of rational numbers. In particular, every positive real number is the least upper bound of the truncations of its infinite decimal representation; for example, $\pi$ is the least upper bound of $\{3,\; 3.1,\; 3.14,\; 3.141,\ldots\}.$

A fundamental property of real numbers is that rational approximations are compatible with arithmetic operations, and, in particular, with multiplication. This means that, if a and b are positive real numbers such that $a=\sup_{x\in A} x$ and $b=\sup_{y\in B} y,$ then $a\cdot b=\sup_{x\in A, y\in B}x\cdot y.$ In particular, the product of two positive real numbers is the least upper bound of the term-by-term products of the sequences of their decimal representations.

As changing the signs transforms least upper bounds into greatest lower bounds, the simplest way to deal with a multiplication involving one or two negative numbers, is to use the rule of signs described above in § Product of two integers. The construction of the real numbers through Cauchy sequences is often preferred in order to avoid consideration of the four possible sign configurations.

=== Product of two complex numbers ===
Two complex numbers can be multiplied by the distributive law and the fact that $i^2=-1$, as follows:
$$\begin{align}
(a + b\, i) \cdot (c + d\, i)
&= a \cdot c + a \cdot d\, i + b \, i \cdot c + b \cdot d \cdot i^2\\
&= (a \cdot c - b \cdot d) + (a \cdot d + b \cdot c) \, i
\end{align}$$

A complex number in polar coordinates

The geometric meaning of complex multiplication can be understood by rewriting complex numbers in polar coordinates:

$$a + b\, i = r \cdot ( \cos(\varphi) +  i \sin(\varphi) ) = r \cdot  e ^{ i \varphi}$$

Furthermore,
$$c + d\, i = s \cdot ( \cos(\psi) +  i\sin(\psi) ) = s \cdot e^{i\psi},$$

from which one obtains
$$(a \cdot c - b \cdot d) + (a \cdot d + b \cdot c) i = r \cdot s \cdot e^{i(\varphi + \psi)}.$$

The geometric meaning is that the magnitudes are multiplied and the arguments are added.

=== Product of two quaternions ===
The product of two quaternions can be found in the article on quaternions. Note, in this case, that $a \cdot b$ and $b \cdot a$ are in general different.

== Computation ==
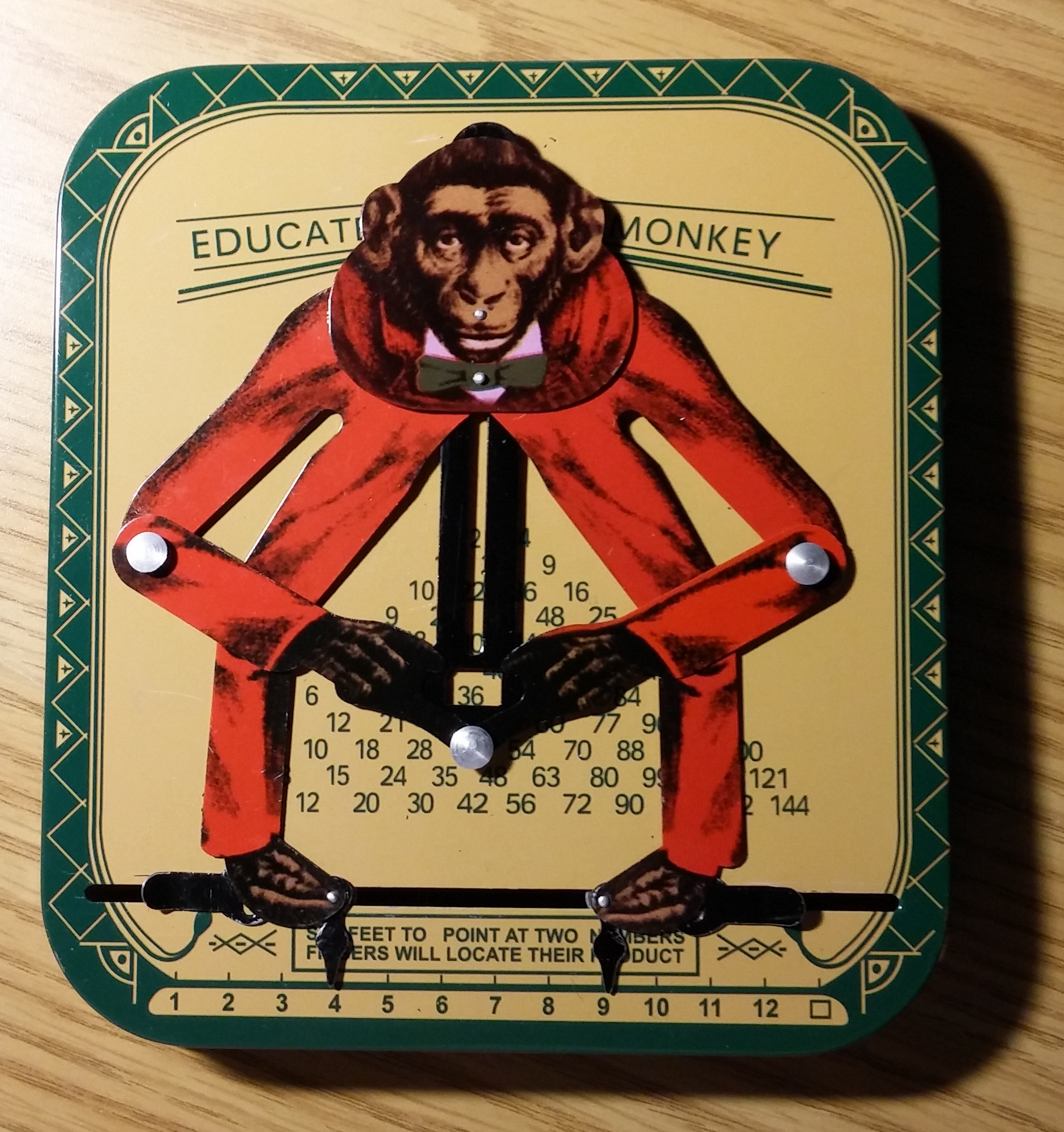
The Educated Monkey—a tin toy dated 1918, used as a multiplication "calculator". For example: set the monkey's feet to 4 and 9, and get the product—36—in its hands.

Many common methods for multiplying numbers using pencil and paper require a multiplication table of memorized or consulted products of small numbers (typically any two numbers from 0 to 9). However, one method, the peasant multiplication algorithm, does not. The example below illustrates "long multiplication" (the "standard algorithm", "grade-school multiplication"):

      23958233
×         5830
———————————————
      00000000 ( =      23,958,233 ×     0)
     71874699  ( =      23,958,233 ×    30)
   191665864   ( =      23,958,233 ×   800)
+ 119791165    ( =      23,958,233 × 5,000)
———————————————
  139676498390 ( = 139,676,498,390        )

In some countries such as Germany, the multiplication above is depicted similarly but with the original problem written on a single line and computation starting with the first digit of the multiplier:

23958233 · 5830
———————————————
   119791165
    191665864
      71874699
       00000000
———————————————
   139676498390

Multiplying numbers to more than a couple of decimal places by hand is tedious and error-prone. Common logarithms were invented to simplify such calculations, since adding logarithms is equivalent to multiplying. The slide rule allowed numbers to be quickly multiplied to about three places of accuracy. Beginning in the early 20th century, mechanical calculators, such as the Marchant, automated multiplication of up to 10-digit numbers. Modern electronic computers and calculators have greatly reduced the need for multiplication by hand.

=== Historical algorithms ===
Methods of multiplication were documented in the writings of ancient Egyptian, Greek, Indian, and Chinese civilizations.

The Ishango bone, dated to about 18,000 to 20,000 BC, may hint at a knowledge of multiplication in the Upper Paleolithic era in Central Africa, but this is speculative.

==== Egyptians ====
The Egyptian method of multiplication of integers and fractions, which is documented in the Rhind Mathematical Papyrus, was by successive additions and doubling. For instance, to find the product of 13 and 21 one had to double 21 three times, obtaining 2 × 21 = 42, 4 × 21 = 2 × 42 = 84, 8 × 21 = 2 × 84 = 168. The full product could then be found by adding the appropriate terms found in the doubling sequence:

13 × 21 = (1 + 4 + 8) × 21 = (1 × 21) + (4 × 21) + (8 × 21) = 21 + 84 + 168 = 273.

==== Babylonians ====
The Babylonians used a sexagesimal positional number system, analogous to the modern-day decimal system. Thus, Babylonian multiplication was very similar to modern decimal multiplication. Because of the relative difficulty of remembering 60 × 60 different products, Babylonian mathematicians employed multiplication tables. These tables consisted of a list of the first twenty multiples of a certain principal number n: n, 2n, ..., 20n; followed by the multiples of 10n: 30n}, 40n, and 50n. Then to compute any sexagesimal product, say 53n, one only needed to add 50n and 3n computed from the table.

==== Chinese ====
38 × 76 = 2888

In the mathematical text Zhoubi Suanjing, dated prior to 300 BC, and the Nine Chapters on the Mathematical Art, multiplication calculations were written out in words, although the early Chinese mathematicians employed Rod calculus involving place value addition, subtraction, multiplication, and division. The Chinese were already using a decimal multiplication table by the end of the Warring States period.

=== Modern methods ===
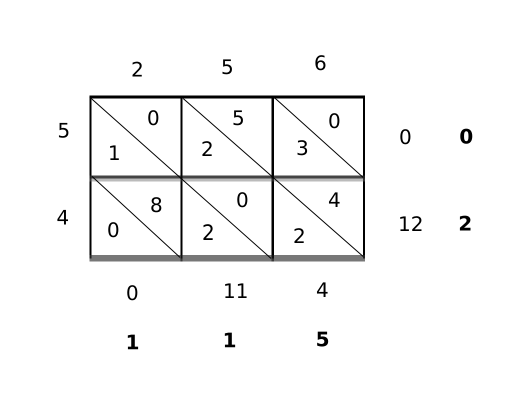
Product of 45 and 256. Note the order of the numerals in 45 is reversed down the left column. The carry step of the multiplication can be performed at the final stage of the calculation (in bold), returning the final product of 45 × 256 = 11520. This is a variant of Lattice multiplication.

The modern method of multiplication based on the Hindu–Arabic numeral system was first described by Brahmagupta. Brahmagupta gave rules for addition, subtraction, multiplication, and division. Henry Burchard Fine, then a professor of mathematics at Princeton University, wrote the following:

The Indians are the inventors not only of the positional decimal system itself, but of most of the processes involved in elementary reckoning with the system. Addition and subtraction they performed quite as they are performed nowadays; multiplication they effected in many ways, ours among them, but division they did cumbrously.

These place value decimal arithmetic algorithms were introduced to Arab countries by Al Khwarizmi in the early 9th century and popularized in the Western world by Fibonacci in the 13th century.

==== Grid method ====
Grid method multiplication, or the box method, is used in primary schools in England and Wales and in some areas of the United States to help teach an understanding of how multiple digit multiplication works. An example of multiplying 34 by 13 would be to lay the numbers out in a grid as follows:

×	30	4
10	300	40
3	90	12

and then add the entries.

=== Computer algorithms ===
The classical method of multiplying two n-digit numbers requires n^{2} digit multiplications. Multiplication algorithms have been designed that reduce the computation time considerably when multiplying large numbers. Methods based on the discrete Fourier transform reduce the computational complexity to O(n log n log log n). In 2016, the factor log log n was replaced by a function that increases much slower, though still not constant. In March 2019, David Harvey and Joris van der Hoeven submitted a paper presenting an integer multiplication algorithm with a complexity of $O(n\log n).$ The algorithm, also based on the fast Fourier transform, is conjectured to be asymptotically optimal. The algorithm is not practically useful, as it only becomes faster for multiplying extremely large numbers (having more than 2^{1729^{12}} bits).

== Products of measurements ==
One can only meaningfully add or subtract quantities of the same type, but quantities of different types can be multiplied or divided without problems. For example, four bags with three marbles each can be thought of as:

[4 bags] × [3 marbles per bag] = 12 marbles.

When two measurements are multiplied together, the product is of a type depending on the types of measurements. The general theory is given by dimensional analysis. This analysis is routinely applied in physics, but it also has applications in finance and other applied fields.

A common example in physics is the fact that multiplying speed by time gives distance. For example:

50 kilometers per hour × 3 hours = 150 kilometers.

In this case, the hour units cancel out, leaving the product with only kilometer units.

Other examples of multiplication involving units include:

- 2.5 meters × 4.5 meters = 11.25 square meters
- 11 meters/second × 9 seconds = 99 meters
- 4.5 residents per house × 20 houses = 90 residents

== Product of a sequence ==
=== Capital pi notation ===
The product of a sequence of factors can be written with the product symbol $\textstyle \prod$, which derives from the capital letter Π (pi) in the Greek alphabet (much like the same way the summation symbol $\textstyle \sum$ is derived from the Greek letter Σ (sigma)). The meaning of this notation is given by
$$\prod_{i=1}^4 (i+1) = (1+1)\,(2+1)\,(3+1)\, (4+1),$$
which results in
$$\prod_{i=1}^4 (i+1) = 120.$$

In such a notation, the variable i represents a varying integer, called the multiplication index, that runs from the lower value 1 indicated in the subscript to the upper value 4 given by the superscript. The product is obtained by multiplying together all factors obtained by substituting the multiplication index for an integer between the lower and the upper values (the bounds included) in the expression that follows the product operator.

More generally, the notation is defined as
$$\prod_{i=m}^n x_i = x_m \cdot x_{m+1} \cdot x_{m+2} \cdot \,\,\cdots\,\, \cdot x_{n-1} \cdot x_n,$$
where m and n are integers or expressions that evaluate to integers. In the case where m = n, the value of the product is the same as that of the single factor x_{m}; if m > n, the product is an empty product whose value is 1—regardless of the expression for the factors.

==== Properties of capital pi notation ====
By definition,
$$\prod_{i=1}^{n}x_i=x_1\cdot x_2\cdot\ldots\cdot x_n.$$

If all factors are identical, a product of n factors is equivalent to exponentiation:
$$\prod_{i=1}^{n}x=x\cdot x\cdot\ldots\cdot x=x^n.$$

Associativity and commutativity of multiplication imply

$\prod_{i=1}^{n}{x_iy_i} =\left(\prod_{i=1}^{n}x_i\right)\left(\prod_{i=1}^{n}y_i\right)$ and
$$\left(\prod_{i=1}^{n}x_i\right)^a =\prod_{i=1}^{n}x_i^a$$

if a is a non-negative integer, or if all $x_i$ are positive real numbers, and
$$\prod_{i=1}^{n}x^{a_i} =x^{\sum_{i=1}^{n}a_i}$$
if all $a_i$ are non-negative integers, or if x is a positive real number.

=== Infinite products ===
One may also consider products of infinitely many factors; these are called infinite products. Notationally, this consists in replacing n above by the infinity symbol ∞. The product of such an infinite sequence is defined as the limit of the product of the first n factors, as n grows without bound. That is,
$$\prod_{i=m}^\infty x_i = \lim_{n\to\infty} \prod_{i=m}^n x_i.$$

One can similarly replace m with negative infinity, and define:
$$\prod_{i=-\infty}^\infty x_i = \left(\lim_{m\to-\infty}\prod_{i=m}^0 x_i\right) \cdot \left(\lim_{n\to\infty} \prod_{i=1}^n x_i\right),$$
provided both limits exist.

== Exponentiation ==
When multiplication is repeated, the resulting operation is known as exponentiation. For instance, the product of three factors of two (2×2×2) is "two raised to the third power", and is denoted by 2^{3}, a two with a superscript three. In this example, the number two is the base, and three is the exponent. In general, the exponent (or superscript) indicates how many times the base appears in the expression, so that the expression
$$a^n = \underbrace{a\times a \times \cdots  \times a}_n = \prod_{i=1}^{n}a$$
indicates that n copies of the base a are to be multiplied together. This notation can be used whenever multiplication is known to be power associative.

== Properties ==
Multiplication of numbers 0–10. Line labels = multiplicand. X axis = multiplier. Y axis = product. Extension of this pattern into other quadrants gives the reason why a negative number times a negative number yields a positive number. Note also how multiplication by zero causes a reduction in dimensionality, as does multiplication by a singular matrix where the determinant is 0. In this process, information is lost and cannot be regained.

For real and complex numbers, which includes, for example, natural numbers, integers, and fractions, multiplication has certain properties:

Commutative property
The order in which two numbers are multiplied does not matter:
$$x \cdot y = y \cdot x.$$
Associative property
Expressions solely involving multiplication or addition are invariant with respect to the order of operations:
$$(x \cdot y) \cdot z = x \cdot (y \cdot z).$$
Distributive property
Holds with respect to multiplication over addition. This identity is of prime importance in simplifying algebraic expressions:
$$x \cdot(y + z) = x \cdot y + x \cdot z.$$
Identity element
The multiplicative identity is 1; anything multiplied by 1 is itself. This feature of 1 is known as the identity property:
$$x \cdot 1 = x.$$
Property of 0
Any number multiplied by 0 is 0. This is known as the zero property of multiplication:
$$x \cdot 0 = 0.$$
Negation
- −1 times any number is equal to the additive inverse of that number:
  $(-1) \cdot x = (-x),$ where $(-x) + x = 0.$
- −1 times −1 is 1:
  $$(-1) \cdot (-1) = 1.$$
Inverse element
Every number x, except 0, has a multiplicative inverse, $\frac{1}{x}$, such that $x \cdot \left(\frac{1}{x}\right) = 1$.
Order preservation
- Multiplication by a positive number preserves the order:
  For a > 0, if b > c then ab > ac.
- Multiplication by a negative number reverses the order:
  For a < 0, if b > c then ab < ac.
- The complex numbers do not have an ordering that is compatible with both addition and multiplication.

Other mathematical systems that include a multiplication operation may not have all these properties. For example, multiplication is not, in general, commutative for matrices and quaternions. Hurwitz's theorem shows that for the hypercomplex numbers of dimension 8 or greater, including the octonions, sedenions, and trigintaduonions, multiplication is generally not associative.

== Axioms ==
In the book Arithmetices principia, nova methodo exposita, Giuseppe Peano proposed axioms for arithmetic based on his axioms for natural numbers. Peano arithmetic has two axioms for multiplication:

- $x \times 0 = 0$
- $x \times S(y) = (x \times y) + x$

Here S(y) represents the successor of y; i.e., the natural number that follows y. The various properties like associativity can be proved from these and the other axioms of Peano arithmetic, including induction. For instance, S(0), denoted by 1, is a multiplicative identity because
$$x \times 1 = x \times S(0) = (x \times 0) + x = 0 + x = x.$$

The axioms for integers typically define them as equivalence classes of ordered pairs of natural numbers. The model is based on treating (x, y) as equivalent to x − y when x and y are treated as integers. Thus both (0, 1) and (1, 2) are equivalent to −1. The multiplication axiom for integers defined this way is
$$(x_p,\, x_m) \times (y_p,\, y_m) = (x_p \times y_p + x_m \times y_m,\; x_p \times y_m + x_m \times y_p).$$

The rule that −1 × −1 = 1 can then be deduced from
$$(0, 1) \times (0, 1) = (0 \times 0 + 1 \times 1,\, 0 \times 1 + 1 \times 0) = (1,0).$$

Multiplication is extended in a similar way to rational numbers and then to real numbers.

== Multiplication with set theory ==
The product of non-negative integers can be defined with set theory using cardinal numbers or the Peano axioms. See below how to extend this to multiplying arbitrary integers, and then arbitrary rational numbers. The product of real numbers is defined in terms of products of rational numbers; see construction of the real numbers.

== Multiplication in group theory ==
There are many sets that, under the operation of multiplication, satisfy the axioms that define group structure. These axioms are closure, associativity, and the inclusion of an identity element and inverses.

A simple example is the set of non-zero rational numbers. Here the identity element is 1, as opposed to groups under addition where the identity is typically 0. Note that with the rationals, zero must be excluded because, under multiplication, it does not have an inverse: there is no rational number that can be multiplied by zero to result in 1. In this example, the result is an abelian group, but that is not always the case.

To see this, consider the set of invertible square matrices of a given dimension over a given field. Here, it is straightforward to verify closure, associativity, and inclusion of identity (the identity matrix) and inverses. However, matrix multiplication is not commutative, which shows that this group is non-abelian.

Another fact worth noticing is that the integers under multiplication do not form a group—even if zero is excluded. This is easily seen by the nonexistence of an inverse for all elements other than 1 and −1.

Multiplication in group theory is typically notated either by a dot or by juxtaposition (the omission of an operation symbol between elements). So multiplying element a by element b could be notated as a · b or ab. When referring to a group via the indication of the set and operation, the dot is used. For example, our first example could be indicated by $\left( \mathbb{Q}/ \{ 0 \} ,\, \cdot \right)$.

== Multiplication of different kinds of numbers ==
Numbers can count (3 apples), order (the 3rd apple), or measure (3.5 feet high); as the history of mathematics has progressed from counting on our fingers to modelling quantum mechanics, multiplication has been generalized to more complicated and abstract types of numbers, and to things that are not numbers (such as matrices) or do not look much like numbers (such as quaternions).

Integers

$N\times M$ is the sum of N copies of M when N and M are positive whole numbers. This gives the number of things in an array N wide and M high. Generalization to negative numbers can be done by

$N\times (-M) = (-N)\times M = - (N\times M)$ and

$(-N)\times (-M) = N\times M$

The same sign rules apply to rational and real numbers.

Rational numbers
Generalization to fractions $\frac{A}{B}\times \frac{C}{D}$ is by multiplying the numerators and denominators, respectively: $\frac{A}{B}\times \frac{C}{D} = \frac{(A\times C)}{(B\times D)}$. This gives the area of a rectangle $\frac{A}{B}$ high and $\frac{C}{D}$ wide, and is the same as the number of things in an array when the rational numbers happen to be whole numbers.
Real numbers
Real numbers and their products can be defined in terms of sequences of rational numbers.
Complex numbers

Considering complex numbers $z_1$ and $z_2$ as ordered pairs of real numbers $(a_1, b_1)$ and $(a_2, b_2)$, the product $z_1\times z_2$ is $(a_1\times a_2 - b_1\times b_2, a_1\times b_2 + a_2\times b_1)$. This is the same as for reals $a_1\times a_2$ when the imaginary parts $b_1$ and $b_2$ are zero.

Equivalently, denoting $\sqrt{-1}$ as $i$, $z_1 \times z_2 = (a_1+b_1i)(a_2+b_2i)=(a_1 \times a_2)+(a_1\times b_2i)+(b_1\times a_2i)+(b_1\times b_2i^2)=(a_1a_2-b_1b_2)+(a_1b_2+b_1a_2)i.$

Alternatively, in trigonometric form, if $z_1 = r_1(\cos\phi_1+i\sin\phi_1), z_2 = r_2(\cos\phi_2+i\sin\phi_2)$, then$z_1z_2 = r_1r_2(\cos(\phi_1 + \phi_2) + i\sin(\phi_1 + \phi_2)).$

Further generalizations
See Multiplication in group theory, above, and multiplicative group, which for example includes matrix multiplication. A very general, and abstract, concept of multiplication is as the "multiplicatively denoted" (second) binary operation in a ring. An example of a ring that is not any of the number systems above is a polynomial ring (polynomials can be added and multiplied, but polynomials are not numbers in any usual sense).
Division
Often division, $\frac{x}{y}$, is the same as multiplication by an inverse, $x\left(\frac{1}{y}\right)$. Multiplication for some types of "numbers" may have corresponding division, without inverses; in an integral domain x may have no inverse "$\frac{1}{x}$" but $\frac{x}{y}$ may be defined. In a division ring there are inverses, but $\frac{x}{y}$ may be ambiguous in non-commutative rings since $x\left(\frac{1}{y}\right)$ need not be the same as $\left(\frac{1}{y}\right)x$.

== See also ==
- Dimensional analysis
- Factorial
- Genaille–Lucas rulers
- Lunar arithmetic
- Multiplication table
- Multiplicative inverse, reciprocal
- Napier's bones
- Peasant multiplication
- Product (mathematics), for generalizations
- Slide rule
- Multiplication algorithm
  - Karatsuba algorithm, for large numbers
  - Toom–Cook multiplication, for very large numbers
  - Schönhage–Strassen algorithm, for huge numbers
- Binary multiplier, an electronic circuit
  - Booth's multiplication algorithm
  - Floating-point arithmetic
  - Multiply–accumulate operation, a.k.a. fused multiply–add
  - Wallace tree
