= Slide calculator =

Mechanical calculator

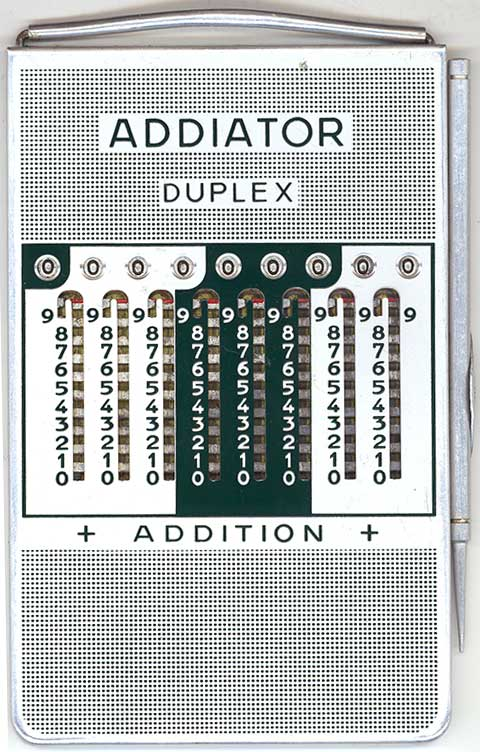
An Addiator Duplex, featuring an addition side

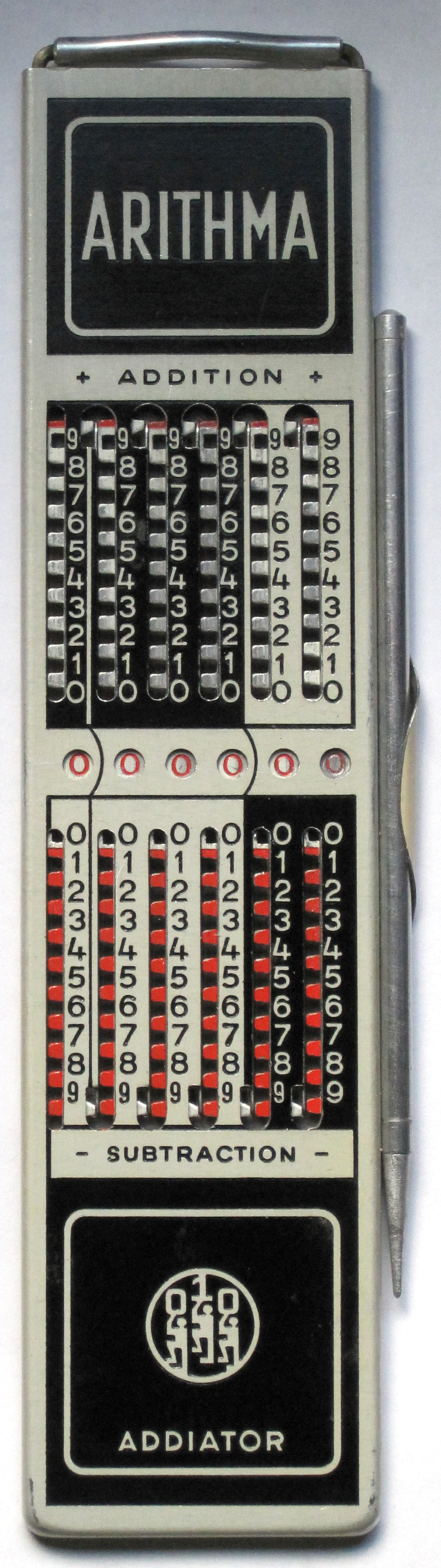
Addition + subtraction, single window

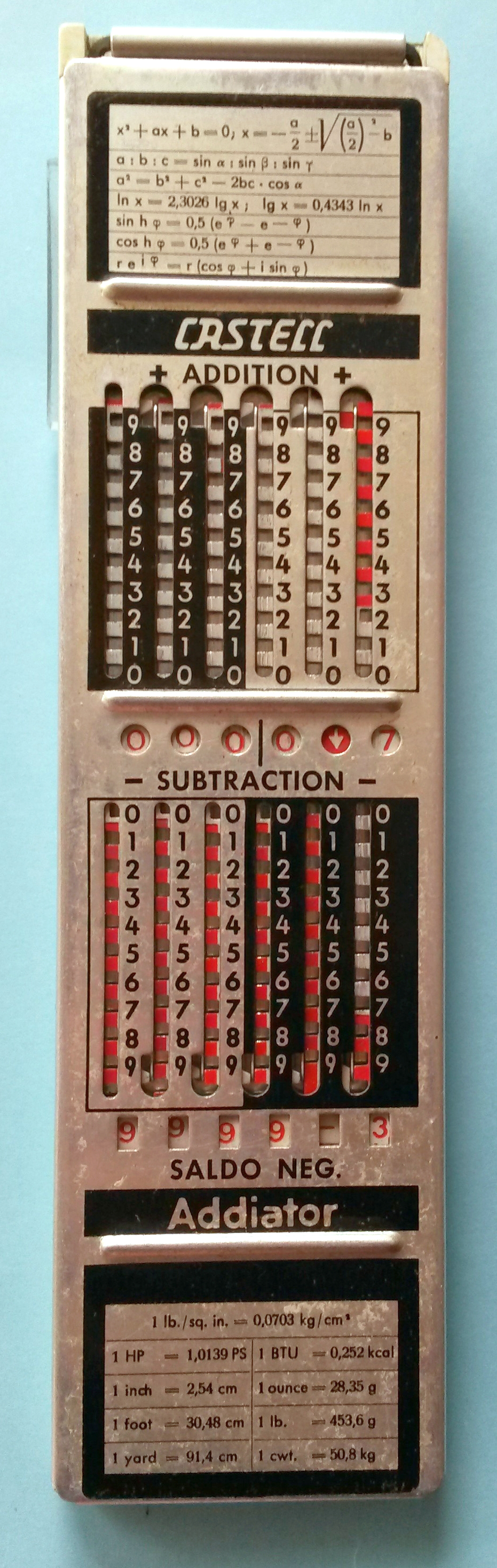
Negative value handling in complementary window

Two types of Addiators

A slide calculator, also known as an Addiator after the best-known brand, is a mechanical calculator capable of addition and subtraction, once made by Addiator Gesellschaft of Berlin, Germany. Variants of it were manufactured from 1920 until 1982. The devices were made obsolete by the electronic calculator.

== Design ==
The Addiator is composed of sheet-metal sliders inside a metal envelope, manipulated by a stylus, with an innovative carry mechanism, doing subtract ten, carry one with a simple stylus movement. Some types of Addiators can also handle negative numbers (with a complementary bottom window or by providing a subtraction mode on the back side of the device).

The Addiator also handles non-decimal measurements, like feet and inches, or pre-decimalization pounds, shillings, and pence. Addition and subtraction require different "screens", handled by turning the instrument over, or flipping a front panel, or, later, by extended sliders and an extra lower panel. Although not always advertised (e.g., the Magic Brain Calculator mentions "add, subtract, multiply" on its front plate), procedures exist for multiplication (by repeated addition or by individual digit multiplications) and division (e.g., by repeated subtraction, or use of additions combined with complementary numbers).

More expensive versions have a built-in slide rule on the back.

== History ==
Sometime between 1666 and 1675, French polymath Claude Perrault invented the first slide calculator, called Abaque rhabdologique (a rabdological abacus), when he needed to do a lot of calculations while working as an architect.

About three decades later, around 1700 or shortly after, French businessman and amateur mathematician César Caze simplified Perrault's design and adapted it to counting money, getting a privilege (patent) in 1711. However, neither of these devices implemented a carry mechanism.

In 1845, German musician and amateur mechanic Heinrich Kummer, who was living in St. Petersburg, saw a mechanical calculator of a different design made by Hayyim Selig Slonimski, and in the next year borrowed the idea of its carry mechanism to greatly improve Caze's device, leading to the modern variant of the slide calculator.

=== Addiator ===
In 1889, Louis-Joseph Troncet successfully commercialized the Addiator, which became one of the most popular calculators of its kind, and the name is often used to refer to the type generally. Addiators appeared in newspaper advertisements as early as 1921, listed at a price of £4 (equivalent to £169.3 in 2025) in the Daily Record of Scotland. As of 1968, Addiators were advertised in American newspapers starting at $3.98 each ($36.85 in 2025).

== See also ==
- Napier's bones – 1617 device for calculating products and quotients
- History of computing hardware
- Pascaline – Early mechanical calculator
