= Wu Ching =

Wu Ching may refer to:

- Wu Ching (judoka) (born 1974), Hong Kong judoka
- Wu Jing (Han dynasty) (died 203), military general under the warlord Sun Jian during the late Han dynasty, whose name can also be romanized as Wu Ching
- Five Classics (五經), a collection of ancient Confucian books, see Four Books and Five Classics
- Wu Ho-ching (born 1991), Hong Kong–based tennis player

== See also ==
- Wu Jing (disambiguation)
- Wujing (disambiguation)
