= George Arthur Plimpton =

American publisher (1855–1936)

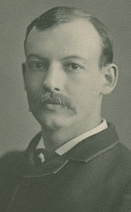
George Arthur Plimpton in the 1870s

George Arthur Plimpton (July 13, 1855 – July 1, 1936) was an American publisher and philanthropist.

== Life and career ==
Plimpton was born in Walpole, Massachusetts, the son of Priscilla Guild (Lewis) and Calvin Gay Plimpton. He was the son and grandson of iron manufacturers. He graduated from the Phillips Exeter Academy in 1873 and Amherst College in 1876. He attended Harvard Law School for a year before joining the publishing firm of Ginn, Heath & Co., a publisher of educational textbooks later known as Ginn & Co., which he would eventually head. In 1928, he was an Invited Speaker of the ICM in Bologna.

Plimpton was an avid collector of historical books and manuscripts, focusing on the history of education. Shortly before his death in 1936, Plimpton donated numerous items to Columbia University's Butler Library, including 317 medieval and Renaissance manuscripts that made Columbia's collection in that area one of the most significant in the country. One of his donations, Plimpton 322, is a Babylonian clay tablet from around 1800 BCE purchased from antiquarian Edgar James Banks. It consists of a table of cuneiform numbers, specifically Pythagorean triples. Described as "one of the world's most famous mathematical artifacts", it may have been a set of solutions for mathematics students. Other donated items included:

- The first printed edition of Euclid's Elements of Geometry from 1482.
- The only known copy of the Treviso Arithmetic, a Venetian math textbook.
- An annotated copy of the works of Homer owned by Philip Melanchthon and inscribed by Martin Luther.
- A copy of Herodotus' Histories owned by Desiderius Erasmus.

Active in educational philanthropy, Plimpton was a trustee of Amherst College, Barnard College, and Constantinople College in Istanbul.

Plimpton was the author of The Education of Shakespeare and The Education of Chaucer.

Plimpton was married to Frances Taylor Pearsons from 1892 until her death in 1900. Their son was Francis Taylor Pearsons Plimpton, father of author George Plimpton. In 1917, he married Fanny Hastings, a descendant of the early colonist Thomas Hastings. Their children were Calvin Hastings Plimpton and Emily Plimpton.
