= David Eugene Smith =

American mathematician

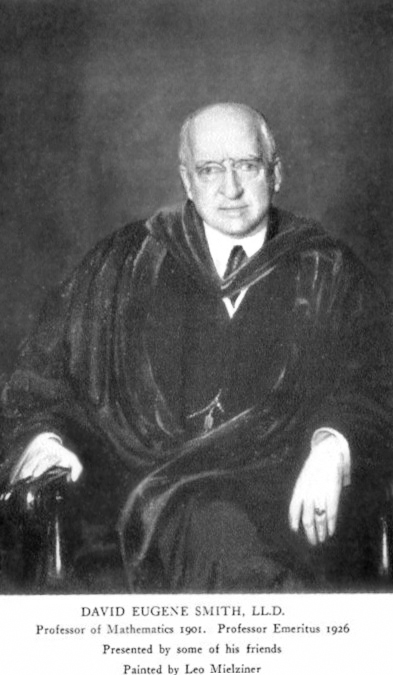
- David Eugene Smith
- Born: January 21, 1860; Cortland, New York
- Died: July 29, 1944 (aged 84); New York City, New York
- Citizenship: United States
- Scientific career
- Fields: Mathematics

David Eugene Smith (January 21, 1860 – July 29, 1944) was an American mathematician, educator, and editor.

== Education and career ==
David Eugene Smith is considered one of the founders of the field of mathematics education. Smith was born in Cortland, New York, to Abram P. Smith, attorney and surrogate judge, and Mary Elizabeth Bronson, who taught her young son Latin and Greek. He attended Syracuse University, graduating in 1881 (Ph. D., 1887; LL.D., 1905). He studied to be a lawyer concentrating in arts and humanities, but accepted an instructorship in mathematics at the Cortland Normal School in 1884 where he attended as a young man. While at the Cortland Normal School Smith became a member of the Young Men's Debating Club (today the Delphic Fraternity.) He became a professor at the Michigan State Normal College in 1891 (later Eastern Michigan University), the principal at the State Normal School in Brockport, New York (1898), and a professor of mathematics at Teachers College, Columbia University (1901) where he remained until his retirement in 1922.

Smith became president of the Mathematical Association of America in 1920 and served as the president of the History of Science Society in 1927. He also wrote a large number of publications of various types. He was editor of the Bulletin of the American Mathematical Society; contributed to other mathematical journals; published a series of textbooks; translated Felix Klein's Famous Problems of Geometry, Fink's History of Mathematics, and the Treviso Arithmetic. He edited Augustus De Morgan's A Budget of Paradoxes (1915) and edited A Source Book in Mathematics (1929). He wrote many books on Mathematics which are listed below. He served as Mathematics Editor of the 14th edition of the Encyclopedia Britannica, 1929. Abacus and Algebra were his own contributions to the first volume.

== Revival ==
In 2020, Francis Su published Mathematics for Human Flourishing, in which he cites Smith's speech entitled "Religio Mathematici" (Latin: faith of a mathematician), his farewell address delivered to the Mathematical Association of America in 1921.

An annotated collection of Smith's writings was published in 2022. It includes postcards (digitized by the Cortland Historical Society), poetry, speeches, and various excerpts from his works. In the foreword, Francis Su writes of Smith: "He rekindled the awe I experienced when I first saw the beauty and depth of mathematics, an awe that I—as a mathematician who now takes these things for granted—might have long since forgotten."

== Works ==
=== Books ===
- Plane and Solid Geometry (1895), with Wooster Woodruff Beman
- History of Modern Mathematics (1896; 4th edition, 1906, reissued as a separate work) Cornell Historical Math Monographs
- The Teaching of Elementary Mathematics (1900) Cornell Historical Math Monographs
- Geometric Exercises in Paper Folding (originally by T. Sundara Row, 1893; revised and edited by Smith with Wooster Woodruff Beman, 1901)
- Intermediate Arithmetic (1905)
- The Teaching of Arithmetic (1909; revised edition, 1913)
- The Teaching of Geometry (1912)
- Rara Arithmetica (1908)
- The Hindu-Arabic Numerals (1911), with Louis Charles Karpinski
- A Bibliography on the Teaching of Mathematics (1912), with Charles Goldziher
- A History of Japanese Mathematics (1914), with Yoshio Mikami
- Number Stories of Long Ago (1919)
- Elements of Projective Geometry (1922), with G. H. Ling & George Wentworth
- Mathematics In series Our Debt to Greece and Rome. (1923) Michigan Historical Math Collection
- History of Mathematics: 2 Volumes (1923/5). Reprinted Dover, 1958.
- A History of Mathematics in America before 1900 (1934), with Jekuthiel Ginsburg; Carus Mathematical Monographs
- Le comput manuel de Magister Anianus. (1928)
- In the Shadow of the Palms: The Selected Works of David Eugene Smith (2022), edited by Tristan Abbey

=== Selected articles ===
- Smith, David Eugene (February 1921). "Among my autographs". The American Mathematical Monthly. 28 (2): 64–65. doi:10.2307/2973036. JSTOR 2973036.

Academic offices
Preceded by Charles McLean	Principal of the Brockport State Normal School; 1898 – 1901	Succeeded by Charles T. McFarlane
