= Zero element =

Zero in algebraic structures

In mathematics, a zero element is one of several generalizations of the number zero to other algebraic structures. These alternate meanings may or may not reduce to the same thing, depending on the context.

== Additive identities ==
An additive identity is the identity element in an additive group or monoid. It corresponds to the element $0$ such that for all $x$ in the group, $0+x=x+0=x$. Some examples of additive identity include:

- The zero vector under vector addition: the vector whose components are all $0$; in a normed vector space its norm (length) is also $0$. Often denoted as $\mathbf{0}$ or $\vec{0}$.
- The zero function or zero map defined by $z(x)=0$, under pointwise addition $(f+g)(x)=f(x)+g(x)$
- The empty set under set union
- An empty sum or empty coproduct
- An initial object in a category (an empty coproduct, and so an identity under coproducts)

== Absorbing elements ==
An absorbing element in a multiplicative semigroup or semiring generalises the property $0\cdot x=0$. Examples include:

- The empty set, which is an absorbing element under Cartesian product of sets, since $\varnothing\times S=\varnothing$
- The zero function or zero map defined by $z(x)=0$ under pointwise multiplication $(f\cdot g)(x)=f(x)\cdot g(x)$

Many absorbing elements are also additive identities, including the empty set and the zero function. Another important example is the distinguished element $0$ in a field or ring, which is both the additive identity and the multiplicative absorbing element, and whose principal ideal is the smallest ideal.

== Zero objects ==
A zero object in a category is both an initial and terminal object (and so an identity under both coproducts and products). For example, the trivial structure (containing only the identity) is a zero object in categories where morphisms must map identities to identities. Specific examples include:

- The trivial group, containing only the identity (a zero object in the category of groups)
- The zero module, containing only the identity (a zero object in the category of modules over a ring)

== Zero morphisms ==
A zero morphism in a category is a generalised absorbing element under function composition: any morphism composed with a zero morphism gives a zero morphism. Specifically, if $0_{XY}:X\to Y$ is the zero morphism among morphisms from $X$ to $Y$, and $f:A\to X$ and $g:Y\to B$ are arbitrary morphisms, then $g\circ 0_{XY}=0_{XB}$ and $0_{XY}\circ f=0_{AY}$.

If a category has a zero object $0$, then there are canonical morphisms $X\to 0$ and $0\to Y$, and composing them gives a zero morphism $0_{XY}:X\to Y$. In the category of groups, for example, zero morphisms are morphisms which always return group identities, thus generalising the function $z(x)=0$.

== Least elements ==
A least element in a partially ordered set or lattice may sometimes be called a zero element, and written either as $0$ or $\bot$.

== Zero module ==
In mathematics, the zero module is the module consisting of only the additive identity for the module's addition function. In the integers, this identity is zero, which gives the name zero module. That the zero module is in fact a module is simple to show; it is closed under addition and multiplication trivially.

== Zero ideal ==
In mathematics, the zero ideal in a ring $R$ is the ideal $0$ consisting of only the additive identity (or zero element). The fact that this is an ideal follows directly from the definition.

== Zero matrix ==
In mathematics, particularly linear algebra, a zero matrix is a matrix with all its entries being zero. It is alternately denoted by the symbol $O$. Some examples of zero matrices are
$$0_{1,1} = \begin{bmatrix}
0 \end{bmatrix}
,\
0_{2,2} = \begin{bmatrix}
0 & 0 \\
0 & 0 \end{bmatrix}
,\
0_{2,3} = \begin{bmatrix}
0 & 0 & 0 \\
0 & 0 & 0 \end{bmatrix}
,\$$

The set of m × n matrices with entries in a ring K forms a module $K_{m,n}$. The zero matrix $0_{K_{m,n}}$ in $K_{m,n}$ is the matrix with all entries equal to $0_K$, where $0_K$ is the additive identity in K.

$$0_{K_{m,n}} = \begin{bmatrix}
0_K & 0_K & \cdots & 0_K \\
0_K & 0_K & \cdots & 0_K \\
\vdots & \vdots &  & \vdots \\
0_K & 0_K & \cdots & 0_K \end{bmatrix}$$

The zero matrix is the additive identity in $K_{m,n}$. That is, for all $A \in K_{m,n}$:

$$0_{K_{m,n}}+A = A + 0_{K_{m,n}} = A$$

There is exactly one zero matrix of any given size $m\times n$ (with entries from a given ring), so when the context is clear, one often refers to the zero matrix. In a matrix ring, the zero matrix serves the role of both an additive identity and an absorbing element. In general, the zero element of a ring is unique, and typically denoted as $0$ without any subscript to indicate the parent ring. Hence the examples above represent zero matrices over any ring.

The zero matrix also represents the linear transformation which sends all vectors to the zero vector.

== Zero tensor ==
In mathematics, the zero tensor is a tensor, of any order, all of whose components are zero. The zero tensor of order $1$ is sometimes known as the zero vector.

Taking a tensor product of any tensor with any zero tensor results in another zero tensor. Among tensors of a given type, the zero tensor of that type serves as the additive identity among those tensors.

== See also ==
- Null semigroup
- Zero divisor
- Zero object
- Zero of a function
- Zero — non-mathematical uses
