= Fibonomial coefficient =

In mathematics, the Fibonomial coefficients or Fibonacci-binomial coefficients are defined as

$$\binom{n}{k}_F = \frac{F_nF_{n-1}\cdots F_{n-k+1}}{F_kF_{k-1}\cdots F_1} = \frac{n!_F}{k!_F (n-k)!_F}$$

where n and k are non-negative integers, 0 ≤ k ≤ n, F_{j} is the j-th Fibonacci number and n!_{F} is the nth Fibonorial, i.e.

$${n!}_F := \prod_{i=1}^n F_i,$$

where 0!_{F}, being the empty product, evaluates to 1.

The fibonomial coefficients can be expressed in terms of the Gaussian binomial coefficients and the golden ratio $\varphi=\frac{1+\sqrt5}2$:

$${\binom n k}_F = \varphi^{k\,(n-k)}{\binom n k}_{-1/\varphi^2} = (-\varphi)^{k\,(k-n)}{\binom n k}_{-\varphi^2}.$$

== Special values ==
The Fibonomial coefficients are all integers. Some special values are:

$$\binom{n}{0}_F = \binom{n}{n}_F = 1$$

$$\binom{n}{1}_F = \binom{n}{n-1}_F = F_n$$

$$\binom{n}{2}_F = \binom{n}{n-2}_F = \frac{F_n F_{n-1}}{F_2 F_1} = F_n F_{n-1},$$

$$\binom{n}{3}_F = \binom{n}{n-3}_F = \frac{F_n F_{n-1} F_{n-2}}{F_3 F_2 F_1} = F_n F_{n-1} F_{n-2} /2,$$

$$\binom{n}{k}_F = \binom{n}{n-k}_F.$$

== Fibonomial triangle ==
The Fibonomial coefficients (sequence A010048 in the OEIS) are similar to binomial coefficients and can be displayed in a triangle similar to Pascal's triangle. The first eight rows are shown below.

$n=0$
$n=1$
$n=2$
$n=3$
$n=4$
$n=5$
$n=6$
$n=7$

1
1	1
1	1	1
1	2	2	1
1	3	6	3	1
1	5	15	15	5	1
1	8	40	60	40	8	1
1	13	104	260	260	104	13	1

The recurrence relation

$$\binom{n}{k}_F = F_{n-k+1} \binom{n-1}{k-1}_F  + F_{k-1} \binom{n-1}{k}_F$$

implies that the Fibonomial coefficients are always integers.

== Applications ==
Dov Jarden proved that the Fibonomials appear as coefficients of an equation involving powers of consecutive Fibonacci numbers, namely Jarden proved that given any generalized Fibonacci sequence $G_n$, that is, a sequence that satisfies $G_n = G_{n-1} + G_{n-2}$ for every $n,$ then

$$\sum_{j = 0}^{k+1}(-1)^{j(j+1)/2}\binom{k+1}{j}_F G_{n-j}^k = 0,$$

for every integer $n$, and every nonnegative integer $k$.
