= Fibonorial =

Mathematical series, portmanteau of "Fibonacci" and "factorial"

In mathematics, the Fibonorial n!_{F}, also called the Fibonacci factorial, where n is a nonnegative integer, is defined as the product of the first n positive Fibonacci numbers, i.e.

$${n!}_F := \prod_{i=1}^n F_i,\quad n \ge 0,$$

where F_{i} is the i^{th} Fibonacci number, and 0!_{F} gives the empty product (defined as the multiplicative identity, i.e. 1).

The Fibonorial n!_{F} is defined analogously to the factorial n!. The Fibonorial numbers are used in the definition of Fibonomial coefficients (or Fibonacci-binomial coefficients) similarly as the factorial numbers are used in the definition of binomial coefficients.

== Asymptotic behaviour ==
The series of fibonorials is asymptotic to a function of the golden ratio $\varphi$: $n!_F \sim C \frac {\varphi^{n (n+1)/2}} {5^{n/2}}$.

Here the fibonorial constant (also called the fibonacci factorial constant) $C$ is defined by $C = \prod_{k=1}^\infty (1-a^k)$, where $a=-\frac{1}{\varphi^2}$ and $\varphi$ is the golden ratio.

An approximate truncated value of $C$ is 1.226742010720 (see (sequence A062073 in the OEIS) for more digits).

== Almost-Fibonorial numbers ==
Almost-Fibonorial numbers: n!_{F} − 1.

Almost-Fibonorial primes: prime numbers among the almost-Fibonorial numbers.

== Quasi-Fibonorial numbers ==
Quasi-Fibonorial numbers: n!_{F} + 1.

Quasi-Fibonorial primes: prime numbers among the quasi-Fibonorial numbers.

== Connection with the q-Factorial ==
The fibonorial can be expressed in terms of the q-factorial and the golden ratio $\varphi=\frac{1+\sqrt5}2$:

$$n!_F = \varphi^{\binom n 2} \, [n]_{-\varphi^{-2}}!.$$

== Sequences ==
OEIS: A003266 Product of first n nonzero Fibonacci numbers F(1), ..., F(n).

OEIS: A059709 and OEIS: A053408 for n such that n!_{F} − 1 and n!_{F} + 1 are primes, respectively.
