= Parallel addition =

Parallel addition may refer to:

- Parallel (operator), a mathematical operation used in electrical engineering
- Parallel addition (computing), a digital circuit performing addition of numbers
