= Empty sum =

Summation where the number of terms is zero

In mathematics, an empty sum, or nullary sum, is a summation where the number of terms is zero. The natural way to extend non-empty sums is to let the empty sum be the additive identity.

Let $a_1$, $a_2$, $a_3$, ... be a sequence of numbers, and let
$$s_m = \sum_{i=1}^m a_i = a_1 + \cdots + a_m$$
be the sum of the first m terms of the sequence. This satisfies the recurrence
$$s_m = s_{m-1} + a_m$$
provided that we use the following natural convention: $s_0=0$. In other words, a "sum" $s_1$ with only one term evaluates to that one term, while a "sum" $s_0$ with no terms evaluates to 0. Allowing a "sum" with only 1 or 0 terms reduces the number of cases to be considered in many mathematical formulas. Such "sums" are natural starting points in induction proofs, as well as in algorithms. For these reasons, the "empty sum is zero" extension is standard practice in mathematics and computer programming (assuming the domain has a zero element). For the same reason, the empty product is taken to be the multiplicative identity.

For sums of other objects (such as vectors, matrices, polynomials), the value of an empty summation is taken to be its additive identity.

== Examples ==
=== Empty linear combinations ===
In linear algebra, a basis of a vector space V is a linearly independent subset B such that every element of V is a linear combination of B. The empty sum convention allows the zero-dimensional vector space V={0} to have a basis, namely the empty set.

== See also ==
- Empty product
- Iterated binary operation
- Empty function
