= Parallel (operator) =

Mathematical operation modeling parallel resistors

Graphical interpretation of the parallel operator with $a \parallel b = c$

The parallel operator $\|$ (pronounced "parallel", following the parallel lines notation from geometry; also known as reduced sum, parallel sum or parallel addition) is a binary operation which is used as a shorthand in electrical engineering, (Note: While the use of the symbol ∥ for "parallel" in geometry reaches as far back as 1673 in John Kersey the elder's work,^{[A]} this came into more use only since about 1875.^{[B]} The usage of a mathematical operator for parallel circuits originates from network theory in electrical engineering. Sundaram Seshu introduced a reduced sum operator in 1956,^{[C]} Kent E. Erickson proposed an asterisk (∗) to symbolize the operator in 1959,^{[D]} whilst Richard James Duffin and William Niles Anderson, Jr. used a colon (:) for the parallel addition since 1966.^{[E]} Sujit Kumar Mitra used a middot (∙) for it in 1970.^{[F]} The first usage of the parallel symbol (∥) for this operator in applied electronics is unknown, but might have originated from Stephen D. Senturia and Bruce D. Wedlock's 1974 book "Electronic Circuits and Applications",^{[G]} which evolved from their introductory electronics course at Massachusetts Institute of Technology (MIT) with concepts of teaching network theory and electronics derived from an earlier course taught by Campbell "Cam" Leach Searle. It was further popularized through John W. McWane's 1981 book "Introduction to Electronics and Instrumentation",^{[H]} which grew out of an identically-named MIT course developed as part of the influential Technical Curriculum Development Project between 1974 and 1979. This symbol was probably also introduced because the other used symbols could be easily confused with signs commonly used for multiplication and division in some contexts.) but is also used in kinetics, fluid mechanics and financial mathematics. The name parallel comes from the use of the operator computing the combined resistance of resistors in parallel.

== Overview ==
A nomogram used to calculate parallel electrical resistance.

The parallel operator represents the reciprocal value of a sum of reciprocal values (sometimes also referred to as the "reciprocal formula" or "harmonic sum") and is defined by:

$$a \parallel b \mathrel{:=} \frac{1}{\dfrac{1}{a} + \dfrac{1}{b}} = \frac{ab}{a + b},$$

where a, b, and $a \parallel b$ are elements of the extended complex numbers $\overline{\mathbb{C}} = \mathbb{C}\cup\{ \infty\}.$

The operator gives half of the harmonic mean of two numbers a and b.

As a special case, for any number $a \in \overline{\mathbb{C}}$:

$$a \parallel a = \frac1{2/a} = \tfrac12a.$$

Further, for all distinct numbers $a \neq b$:

$$\big| \,a \parallel b \,\big| > \tfrac12 \min\bigl(|a|, |b|\bigr),$$

with $\big|\, a \parallel b \,\big|$ representing the absolute value of $a \parallel b$, and $\min(x, y)$ meaning the minimum (least element) among x and y.

If $a$ and $b$ are distinct positive real numbers then $\tfrac12 \min(a, b) < \big|\, a \parallel b \,\big| < \min(a, b).$

The concept has been extended from a scalar operation to matrices and further generalized.

== Notation ==
The operator was originally introduced as reduced sum by Sundaram Seshu in 1956, studied as operator ∗ by Kent E. Erickson in 1959, and popularized by Richard James Duffin and William Niles Anderson, Jr. as parallel addition or parallel sum operator : in mathematics and network theory since 1966. While some authors continue to use this symbol up to the present, for example, Sujit Kumar Mitra used ∙ as a symbol in 1970. In applied electronics, a ∥ sign became more common as the operator's symbol around 1974. (Note: In electrical circuits the parallel operator can be applied to, respectively, parallel resistances (R in [Ω]) or inductances (L in [H]) as well as to impedances (Z in [Ω]) or reactances (X in [Ω]). Ignoring the operator symbol's then-misleading glyph it can also be applied to series circuits of, respectively, conductances (G in [S]) or capacitances (C in [F]) as well as to admittances (Y in [S]) or susceptances (B in [S]).) This was often written as doubled vertical line (||) available in most character sets (sometimes italicized as //), but now can be represented using Unicode character U+2225 ( ∥ ) for "parallel to". In LaTeX and related markup languages, the macros \| and \parallel are often used (and rarely \smallparallel is used) to denote the operator's symbol.

== Properties ==
Let $\widetilde{\C}$ represent the extended complex plane excluding zero, $\widetilde{\C} := \C \cup \{\infty\} \smallsetminus \{0\},$ and $\varphi$ the bijective function from $\C$ to $\widetilde{\C}$ such that $\varphi(z)=1/z.$ One has identities

$$\varphi(zt)=\varphi(z)\varphi(t),$$

and

$$\varphi(z+t)=\varphi(z)\parallel \varphi(t)$$

This implies immediately that $\widetilde{\C}$ is a field where the parallel operator takes the place of the addition, and that this field is isomorphic to $\C.$

The following properties may be obtained by translating through $\varphi$ the corresponding properties of the complex numbers.

=== Field properties ===
As for any field, $(\widetilde{\C}, \,\parallel\,, \,\cdot\,)$ satisfies a variety of basic identities.

It is commutative under parallel and multiplication:

$$\begin{align}
a \parallel b &= b \parallel a \\[3mu]
ab &= ba
\end{align}$$

It is associative under parallel and multiplication:

$$\begin{align}
&(a \parallel b) \parallel c = a \parallel (b \parallel c) = a \parallel b \parallel c
= \frac{1}{\dfrac{1}{a} + \dfrac{1}{b} + \dfrac{1}{c}} = \frac{a b c}{a b + a c + b c}, \\
&(ab) c = a (b c) = a b c.
\end{align}$$

Both operations have an identity element; for parallel the identity is $\infty$ while for multiplication the identity is 1:

$$\begin{align}
&a \parallel \infty = \infty \parallel a = \frac1{\dfrac1a + 0} = a, \\
&1 \cdot a = a \cdot 1 = a.
\end{align}$$

Every element $a$ of $\widetilde{\C}$ has an inverse under parallel, equal to $-a,$ the additive inverse under addition. (But 0 has no inverse under parallel.)

$$a \parallel (-a) = \frac1{\dfrac1a - \dfrac1a} = \infty.$$

The identity element $\infty$ is its own inverse, $\infty \parallel \infty = \infty.$

Every element $a \neq \infty$ of $\widetilde{\C}$ has a multiplicative inverse $a^{-1} = 1/a$:

$$a\cdot\frac1a = 1.$$

Multiplication is distributive over parallel:

$$k (a \parallel b) = \frac{k}{\dfrac1a + \dfrac1b} = \frac{1}{\dfrac1{ka} + \dfrac1{kb}} = ka \parallel kb.$$

=== Repeated parallel ===
Repeated parallel is equivalent to division,

$$\underbrace{a \parallel a \parallel \cdots \parallel a}_{n\text{ times}}
= \frac1{\underbrace{\dfrac1a + \dfrac1a + \cdots + \dfrac1a}_{n\text{ times}}} = \frac an.$$

Or, multiplying both sides by n,

$$n (\underbrace{a \parallel a \parallel \cdots \parallel a}_{n\text{ times}}) = a.$$

Unlike for repeated addition, this does not commute:

$$\frac ab \neq \frac ba \quad \text{implies}\quad
\underbrace{a \parallel a \parallel \cdots \parallel a}_{b\text{ times}} \,\neq\, \underbrace{b \parallel b \parallel \cdots \parallel b}_{a\text{ times}}~\!.$$

=== Binomial expansion ===
Using the distributive property twice, the product of two parallel binomials can be expanded as

$$\begin{align}
(a \parallel b) (c \parallel d)
&= a(c \parallel d) \parallel b(c \parallel d) \\[3mu]
&= ac \parallel ad \parallel bc \parallel bd.
\end{align}$$

The square of a binomial is

$$\begin{align}
(a \parallel b)^2
&= a^2 \parallel ab \parallel ba \parallel b^2 \\[3mu]
&= a^2 \parallel \tfrac12ab \parallel b^2.
\end{align}$$

The cube of a binomial is

$$(a \parallel b)^3 = a^3 \parallel \tfrac13a^2b \parallel \tfrac13ab^2 \parallel b^3.$$

In general, the nth power of a binomial can be expanded using binomial coefficients which are the reciprocal of those under addition, resulting in an analog of the binomial formula:

$$(a \parallel b)^n = \frac{a^n}{\binom n0} \parallel \frac{a^{n-1}b}{\binom n1} \parallel \cdots \parallel \frac{a^{n-k}b^k}{\binom nk} \parallel \cdots \parallel \frac{b^n}{\binom nn}.$$

=== Logarithm and exponential ===
The following identities hold:

$$\frac{1}{\log(ab)} = \frac{1}{\log(a)}\parallel\frac{1}{\log(b)},$$

$$\exp\left(\frac{1}{a\parallel b}\right) = \exp\left(\frac{1}{a}\right)\exp\left(\frac{1}{b}\right)$$

=== Factoring parallel polynomials ===
As with a polynomial under addition, a parallel polynomial with coefficients $a_k$ in $\widetilde\C$ (with $a_0 \neq \infty$) can be factored into a product of monomials:

$$\begin{align}
&a_0x^n \parallel a_1x^{n-1} \parallel \cdots \parallel a_n =a_0(x \parallel -r_1)(x \parallel -r_2)\cdots(x \parallel -r_n)
\end{align}$$

for some roots $r_k$ (possibly repeated) in $\widetilde\C.$

Analogous to polynomials under addition, the polynomial equation

$$(x \parallel -r_1)(x \parallel -r_2)\cdots(x \parallel -r_n) = \infty$$

implies that $x = r_k$ for some k.

=== Quadratic formula ===
A linear equation can be easily solved via the parallel inverse:

$$\begin{align}
ax\parallel b &= \infty \\[3mu]
\implies x &= -\frac ba.
\end{align}$$

To solve a parallel quadratic equation, complete the square to obtain an analog of the quadratic formula

$$\begin{align}
ax^2\parallel bx \parallel c &= \infty \\[5mu]
x^2\parallel \frac{b}{a}x &= - \frac{c}{a} \\[5mu]
x^2\parallel \frac{b}{a}x\parallel \frac{4b^2}{a^2} &= \left(-\frac{c}{a}\right) \parallel \frac{4b^2}{a^2} \\[5mu]
\left(x\parallel \frac{2b}{a}\right)^2 &= \frac{b^2 \parallel -\tfrac14ac}{\tfrac14a^2} \\[5mu]
\implies x &= \frac{(-b) \parallel \pm\sqrt{b^2 \parallel -\tfrac14ac} }{\tfrac12a}.
\end{align}$$

=== Including zero ===
The extended complex numbers including zero, $\overline{\mathbb{C}} := \C \cup \infty,$ is no longer a field under parallel and multiplication, because 0 has no inverse under parallel. (This is analogous to the way $\bigl(\overline{\mathbb{C}}, {+}, {\cdot} \bigr)$ is not a field because $\infty$ has no additive inverse.)

For every non-zero a,

$$a \parallel 0 = \frac1{\dfrac1a + \dfrac10} = 0$$

The quantity $0 \parallel (-0) = 0 \parallel 0$ can either be left undefined (see indeterminate form) or defined to equal 0.

=== Precedence ===
In the absence of parentheses, the parallel operator is defined as taking precedence over addition or subtraction, similar to multiplication.

== Applications ==
There are applications of the parallel operator in mechanics, electronics, optics, and study of periodicity:

=== Reduced mass ===
Given masses m and M, the reduced mass $\mu = \frac{m M}{m + M} = m \parallel M$ is frequently applied in mechanics. For instance, when the masses orbit each other, the moment of inertia is their reduced mass times the distance between them.

=== Circuit analysis ===
In electrical engineering, the parallel operator can be used to calculate the total impedance of various serial and parallel electrical circuits. There is a duality between the usual (series) sum and the parallel sum.

For instance, the total resistance of resistors connected in parallel is the reciprocal of the sum of the reciprocals of the individual resistors.

$$\begin{align}
\frac{1}{R_\text{eq}} &= \frac{1}{R_1} + \frac{1}{R_2} + \cdots + \frac{1}{R_n} \\[5mu]
R_\text{eq} &= R_1 \parallel R_2 \parallel \cdots \parallel R_n.
\end{align}$$

Likewise for the total capacitance of serial capacitors.

=== Coalescence of independent probability density functions. ===
The coalesced density function f_{coalesced}(x) of n independent probability density functions f_{1}(x), f_{2}(x), …, f_{n}(x), is equal to the reciprocal of the sum of the reciprocal densities.

$$\begin{align}
\frac{1}{f_{coalesced}(x)} &= \frac{1}{f_1(x)} + \frac{1}{f_2(x)} + \cdots + \frac{1}{f_n(x)} \\[5mu]
\end{align}$$

=== Lens equation ===
In geometric optics the thin lens approximation to the lens maker's equation.

$$f = \rho_{virtual}\parallel \rho_{object}$$

=== Synodic period ===
The time between conjunctions of two orbiting bodies is called the synodic period. If the period of the slower body is T_{2}, and the period of the faster is T_{1}, then the synodic period is

$$T_{syn} = T_1 \parallel (-T_2) .$$

== Examples ==
Question:

Three resistors $R_1 = 270\,\mathrm{k\Omega}$, $R_2 = 180\,\mathrm{k\Omega}$ and $R_3 = 120\,\mathrm{k\Omega}$ are connected in parallel. What is their resulting resistance?

Answer:

$$\begin{align}
R_1 \parallel R_2 \parallel R_3 &= 270\,\mathrm{k\Omega} \parallel 180\,\mathrm{k\Omega} \parallel 120\,\mathrm{k\Omega} \\[5mu]
&= \frac{1}{\dfrac{1}{270\,\mathrm{k\Omega}} + \dfrac{1}{180\,\mathrm{k\Omega}} + \dfrac{1}{120\,\mathrm{k\Omega}}} \\[5mu]
&\approx 56.84 \,\mathrm{k\Omega}
\end{align}$$
The effectively resulting resistance is ca. 57 kΩ.

Question:

A construction worker raises a wall in 5 hours. Another worker would need 7 hours for the same work. How long does it take to build the wall if both workers work in parallel?

Answer:

$$t_1 \parallel t_2 = 5\,\mathrm h \parallel 7\,\mathrm h = \frac{1}{\dfrac{1}{5\,\mathrm h} + \dfrac{1}{7\,\mathrm h}} \approx 2.92\,\mathrm h$$
They will finish in close to 3 hours.

== Implementation ==
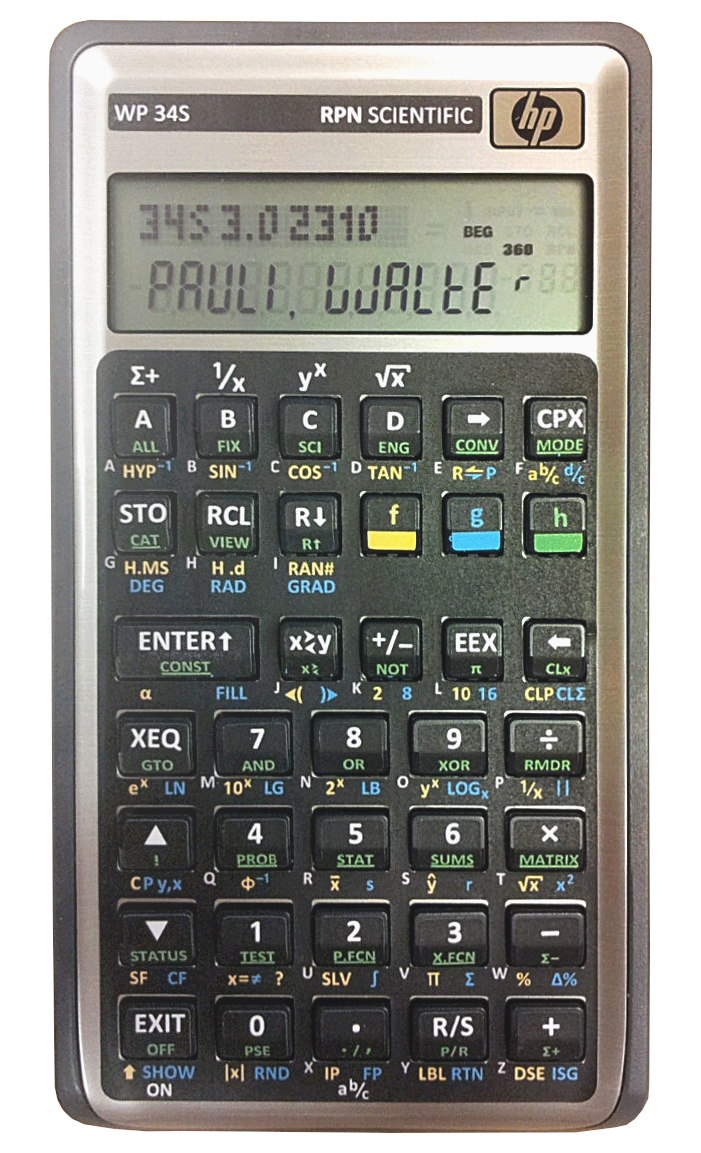
WP 34S with parallel operator (∥) on the g+÷ key

Suggested already by Kent E. Erickson as a subroutine in digital computers in 1959, the parallel operator is implemented as a keyboard operator on the Reverse Polish Notation (RPN) scientific calculators WP 34S since 2008 as well as on the WP 34C and WP 43S since 2015, allowing to solve even cascaded problems with few keystrokes like 270↵ Enter180∥120∥.

== Projective view ==
Given a field F there are two embeddings of F into the projective line P(F): z → [z : 1] and z → [1 : z]. These embeddings overlap except for [0:1] and [1:0]. The parallel operator relates the addition operation between the embeddings. In fact, the homographies on the projective line are represented by 2 x 2 matrices M(2,F), and the field operations (+ and ×) are extended to homographies. Each embedding has its addition a + b represented by the following matrix multiplications in M(2,A):

$$\begin{align}
\begin{pmatrix} 1 & 0 \\ a & 1 \end{pmatrix}   \begin{pmatrix} 1 & 0 \\ b & 1 \end{pmatrix}
&= \begin{pmatrix} 1 & 0 \\ a+b & 1 \end{pmatrix},
\\[10mu]
\begin{pmatrix} 1 & a \\ 0 & 1 \end{pmatrix}   \begin{pmatrix} 1 & b \\ 0 & 1 \end{pmatrix}
&= \begin{pmatrix} 1 & a+b \\ 0 & 1 \end{pmatrix}.
\end{align}$$

The two matrix products show that there are two subgroups of M(2,F) isomorphic to (F,+), the additive group of F. Depending on which embedding is used, one operation is +, the other is $\parallel.$

== See also ==
- Mediant (mathematics)
