= Strict initial object =

Object in category theory

In the mathematical discipline of category theory, a strict initial object is an initial object 0 of a category C with the property that every morphism in C with codomain 0 is an isomorphism. In a Cartesian closed category, every initial object is strict. Also, if C is a distributive or extensive category, then the initial object 0 of C is strict.
