= Addition =

Arithmetic operation

3 + 2 = 5 with apples, a popular choice in textbooks

Addition, usually denoted with the plus sign +, is one of the four basic operations of arithmetic, the other three being subtraction, multiplication, and division. The addition of two whole numbers results in the total or sum of those values combined. For example, the adjacent image shows two columns of apples, one with three apples and the other with two apples, totaling to five apples. This observation is expressed as "3 + 2 = 5", which is read as "three plus two equals five".

Besides counting items, addition can also be defined and executed without referring to concrete objects, using abstractions called numbers instead, such as integers, real numbers, and complex numbers. Addition belongs to arithmetic, a branch of mathematics. In algebra, another area of mathematics, addition can also be performed on abstract objects such as vectors, matrices, and elements of additive groups.

Addition has several important properties. It is commutative, meaning that the order of the numbers being added does not matter, so 3 + 2 = 2 + 3. It is also associative, meaning that when one adds more than two numbers, the order in which addition is performed does not matter. Repeated addition of 1 is the same as counting (see Successor function). Addition of 0 does not change a number. Addition also obeys rules concerning related operations such as subtraction and multiplication.

Performing addition is one of the simplest numerical tasks to perform. Addition of very small numbers is accessible to toddlers; the most basic task, 1 + 1, can be performed by infants as young as five months, and even by some members of other animal species. In primary education, students are taught to add numbers in the decimal system, beginning with single digits and progressively tackling more difficult problems. Mechanical aids range from the ancient abacus to the modern computer, where research on the most efficient implementations of addition continues to this day.

== Notation and terminology ==
The plus sign

Addition is written using the plus sign "+" between the terms, and the result is expressed with an equals sign. For example, $1 + 2 = 3$ reads "one plus two equals three". Nonetheless, there are some situations where addition is understood, even though no symbol appears: a whole number followed immediately by a fraction indicates the sum of the two, called a mixed number, with an example,
$$3\frac{1}{2}=3+\frac{1}{2}=3.5.$$
This notation can cause confusion, since in most other contexts, juxtaposition denotes multiplication instead.

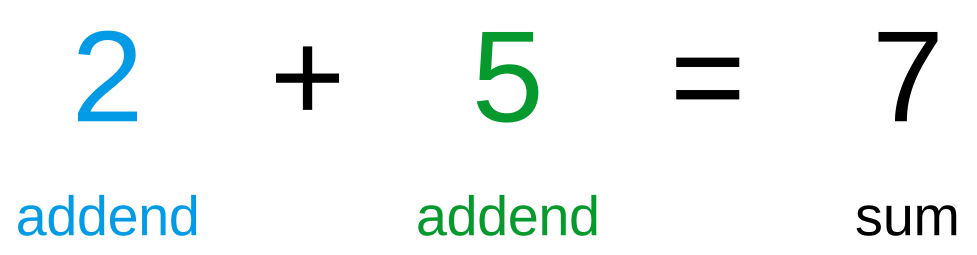
The terms of addends in the operation of an addition

The numbers or the objects to be added in general addition are collectively referred to as the terms, the addends or the summands. This terminology carries over to the summation of multiple terms. This is to be distinguished from factors, which are multiplied. Some authors call the first addend the augend. In fact, during the Renaissance, many authors did not consider the first addend an "addend" at all. Today, due to the commutative property of addition, "augend" is rarely used, and both terms are generally called addends.

All of the above terminology derives from Latin. "Addition" and "add" are English words derived from the Latin verb addere, which is in turn a compound of ad "to" and dare "to give", from the Proto-Indo-European root *deh₃- "to give"; thus to add is to give to. Using the gerundive suffix -nd results in "addend", "thing to be added". (Note: "Addend" is not a Latin word; in Latin it must be further conjugated, as in numerus addendus "the number to be added".) Likewise from augere "to increase", one gets "augend", "thing to be increased".

Redrawn illustration from The Art of Nombryng, one of the first English arithmetic texts, in the 15th century.

"Sum" and "summand" derive from the Latin noun summa "the highest" or "the top", used in Medieval Latin phrase summa linea ("top line") meaning the sum of a column of numerical quantities, following the ancient Greek and Roman practice of putting the sum at the top of a column. Addere and summare date back at least to Boethius, if not to earlier Roman writers such as Vitruvius and Frontinus; Boethius also used several other terms for the addition operation. The later Middle English terms "adden" and "adding" were popularized by Chaucer.

== Definition and interpretations ==
Addition is one of the four basic operations of arithmetic, with the other three being subtraction, multiplication, and division. This operation works by adding two or more terms. An arbitrary number of addition operations is called a summation. An infinite summation is a delicate procedure known as a series, and it can be expressed through capital sigma notation $\sum$, which compactly denotes iteration of the addition operation based on the given indexes. For example,
$$\sum_{k=1}^5 k^2 = 1^2 + 2^2 + 3^2 + 4^2 + 5^2 = 55.$$

Addition is used to model many physical processes. Even for the simple case of adding natural numbers, there are many possible interpretations and even more visual representations.

=== Combining sets ===
One set has three shapes while the other set has two. The total of shapes is five, which is a consequence of the addition of the objects from the two sets: $3 + 2 = 5$.

Possibly the most basic interpretation of addition lies in combining sets, that is:

When two or more disjoint collections are combined into a single collection, the number of objects in the single collection is the sum of the numbers of objects in the original collections.

This interpretation is easy to visualize, with little danger of ambiguity. It is also useful in higher mathematics (for the rigorous definition it inspires, see § Natural numbers below). However, it is not obvious how one should extend this interpretation to include fractional or negative numbers.

One possibility is to consider collections of objects that can be easily divided, such as pies or, still better, segmented rods. Rather than solely combining collections of segments, rods can be joined end-to-end, which illustrates another conception of addition: adding not the rods but the lengths of the rods.

=== Extending a length ===
A number-line visualization of the addition $2 + 4 = 6$. A "jump" of length $2$ followed by another of length $4$, is the same as a jump of length $6$.

A number-line visualization of the addition $2 + 4 = 6$ realized as four additions of one. A translation by $4$ is equivalent to four translations by $1$.

A second interpretation of addition comes from extending an initial length by a given length:

When an original length is extended by a given amount, the final length is the sum of the original length and the length of the extension.

The sum $a + b$ can be interpreted as a binary operation that combines $a$ and $b$ algebraically, or it can be interpreted as the addition of $b$ more units to $a$. Under the latter interpretation, the parts of a sum $a + b$ play asymmetric roles, and the operation $a + b$ is viewed as applying the unary operation $+b$ to $a$. Instead of calling both $a$ and $b$ addends, it is more appropriate to call $a$ the "augend" in this case, since $a$ plays a passive role. The unary view is also useful when discussing subtraction, because each unary addition operation has an inverse unary subtraction operation, and vice versa.

== Properties ==
=== Commutativity ===
4 + 2 = 2 + 4 with blocks

Addition is commutative, meaning that one can change the order of the terms in a sum, but still get the same result. Symbolically, if $a$ and $b$ are any two numbers, then:
$$a + b = b + a.$$
The fact that addition is commutative is known as the "commutative law of addition" or "commutative property of addition". Some other binary operations are commutative too as in multiplication, but others are not as in subtraction and division.

=== Associativity ===
2 + (1 + 3) = (2 + 1) + 3 with segmented rods

Addition is associative, which means that when three or more numbers are added together, the order of operations does not change the result. For any three numbers $a$, $b$, and $c$, it is true that:
$$(a + b) + c = a + (b + c).$$
For example, $(1 + 2) + 3 = 1 + (2 + 3)$.

When addition is used together with other operations, the order of operations becomes important. In the standard order of operations, addition is a lower priority than exponentiation, nth roots, multiplication and division, but is given equal priority to subtraction.

=== Identity element ===
5 + 0 = 5 with bags of dots

Adding zero to any number does not change the number. In other words, zero is the identity element for addition, and is also known as the additive identity. In symbols, for every $a$, one has:
$$a + 0 = 0 + a = a.$$
This law was first identified in Brahmagupta's Brahmasphutasiddhanta in 628 AD, although he wrote it as three separate laws, depending on whether $a$ is negative, positive, or zero itself, and he used words rather than algebraic symbols. Later, other Indian mathematicians refined the concept. Around the year 830, Mahavira wrote, "zero becomes the same as what is added to it", corresponding to the unary statement $0 + a = a.$ In the 12th century, Bhaskara wrote, "In the addition of [zero], or subtraction of it, the quantity, positive or negative, remains the same", corresponding to the unary statement $a + 0 = a.$

=== Successor ===
Within the context of integers, addition of one also plays a special role: for any integer $a$, the integer $a + 1$ is the least integer greater than $a$, also known as the successor of $a$. For instance, 3 is the successor of 2, and 7 is the successor of 6. Because of this succession, the value of $a + b$ can also be seen as the $b$-th successor of $a$, making addition an iterated succession. For example, 6 + 2 is 8, because 8 is the successor of 7, which is the successor of 6, making 8 the second successor of 6.

=== Units ===
To numerically add physical quantities with units, they must be expressed with common units. For example, adding 50 milliliters to 150 milliliters gives 200 milliliters. However, if a measure of 5 feet is extended by 2 inches, the sum is 62 inches, since 60 inches is synonymous with 5 feet. On the other hand, it is usually meaningless to try to add 3 meters and 4 square meters, since those units are incomparable; this sort of consideration is fundamental in dimensional analysis.

== Performing addition ==
=== Innate ability ===
Studies on mathematical development starting around the 1980s have exploited the phenomenon of habituation: infants look longer at situations that are unexpected. A seminal experiment by Karen Wynn in 1992 involving Mickey Mouse dolls manipulated behind a screen demonstrated that five-month-old infants expect 1 + 1 to be 2, and they are comparatively surprised when a physical situation seems to imply that 1 + 1 is either 1 or 3. This finding has since been affirmed by a variety of laboratories using different methodologies. Another 1992 experiment with older toddlers, between 18 and 35 months, exploited their development of motor control by allowing them to retrieve ping-pong balls from a box; the youngest responded well for small numbers, while older subjects were able to compute sums up to 5.

Even some nonhuman animals show a limited ability to add, particularly primates. In a 1995 experiment imitating Wynn's 1992 result (but using eggplants instead of dolls), rhesus macaque and cottontop tamarin monkeys performed similarly to human infants. More dramatically, after being taught the meanings of the Arabic numerals 0 through 4, one chimpanzee was able to compute the sum of two numerals without further training. More recently, Asian elephants have demonstrated an ability to perform basic arithmetic.

=== Addition by counting ===
Typically, children first master counting. When given a problem that requires that two items and three items be combined, young children model the situation with physical objects, often fingers or a drawing, and then count the total. As they gain experience, they learn or discover the strategy of "counting-on": asked to find two plus three, children count three past two, saying "three, four, five" (usually ticking off fingers), and arriving at five. This strategy seems almost universal; children can easily pick it up from peers or teachers. Most discover it independently. With additional experience, children learn to add more quickly by exploiting the commutativity of addition by counting up from the larger number, in this case, starting with three and counting "four, five." Eventually children begin to recall certain addition facts ("number bonds"), either through experience or rote memorization. Once some facts are committed to memory, children begin to derive unknown facts from known ones. For example, a child asked to add six and seven may know that 6 + 6 = 12 and then reason that 6 + 7 is one more, or 13. Such derived facts can be found very quickly and most elementary school students eventually rely on a mixture of memorized and derived facts to add fluently.

Different nations introduce whole numbers and arithmetic at different ages, with many countries teaching addition in pre-school. However, throughout the world, addition is taught by the end of the first year of elementary school.

=== Single-digit addition ===
An ability to add a pair of single digits (numbers from 0 to 9) is a prerequisite for addition of arbitrary numbers in the decimal system. With 10 choices for each of the two digits to be added, this makes 100 single-digit "addition facts", which can be presented in an addition table.

Addition table
+	0	1	2	3	4	5	6	7	8	9
0	0	1	2	3	4	5	6	7	8	9
1	1	2	3	4	5	6	7	8	9	10
2	2	3	4	5	6	7	8	9	10	11
3	3	4	5	6	7	8	9	10	11	12
4	4	5	6	7	8	9	10	11	12	13
5	5	6	7	8	9	10	11	12	13	14
6	6	7	8	9	10	11	12	13	14	15
7	7	8	9	10	11	12	13	14	15	16
8	8	9	10	11	12	13	14	15	16	17
9	9	10	11	12	13	14	15	16	17	18

Learning to fluently and accurately compute single-digit additions is a major focus of early schooling in arithmetic. Sometimes students are encouraged to memorize the full addition table by rote, but pattern-based strategies are typically more enlightening and, for most people, more efficient:

- Commutative property: Mentioned above, using the pattern $a + b = b + a$ reduces the number of "addition facts" from 100 to 55.
- One or two more: Adding 1 or 2 is a basic task, and it can be accomplished through counting on or, ultimately, intuition.
- Zero: Since zero is the additive identity, adding zero is trivial. Nonetheless, in the teaching of arithmetic, some students are introduced to addition as a process that always increases the addends; word problems may help rationalize the "exception" of zero.
- Doubles: Adding a number to itself is related to counting by two and to multiplication. Doubles facts form a backbone for many related facts, and students find them relatively easy to grasp.
- Near-doubles: Sums such as 6 + 7 = 13 can be quickly derived from the doubles fact 6 + 6 = 12 by adding one more, or from 7 + 7 = 14 but subtracting one.
- Five and ten: Sums of the form 5 + x and 10 + x are usually memorized early and can be used for deriving other facts. For example, 6 + 7 = 13 can be derived from 5 + 7 = 12 by adding one more.
- Making ten: An advanced strategy uses 10 as an intermediate for sums involving 8 or 9; for example, 8 + 6 = 8 + 2 + 4 = 10 + 4 = 14.

As students gain experience with addition, they gradually memorize an increasing number of basic addition facts and become more fluent in recalling them. Repeated practice also helps students recognize relationships among addition facts, allowing them to derive sums that they do not immediately recall. For example, a student who knows that 6 + 6 = 12 can use this fact to determine that 6 + 7 = 13. Over time, commonly used facts and strategies such as doubles, near-doubles, making ten, and counting on can become increasingly automatic. This development of fluency allows students to calculate single-digit sums more quickly and accurately, while reducing the amount of deliberate mental effort required for familiar additions.

=== Carry ===
An addition with carry

The standard algorithm for adding multi-digit numbers is to align the addends vertically and add the columns by using the above addition table, starting from the ones column on the right. If the result of a column exceeds nine, the extra digit is "carried" into the next column. For example, in the following image, the ones in the addition of 59 + 27 is 9 + 7 = 16, and the digit 1 is the carry. An alternate strategy starts adding from the most significant digit on the left; this route makes carrying a little clumsier, but it is faster at getting a rough estimate of the sum. (Note: For example, al-Khwarizmi performed multi-digit addition in this way from left to right.)

=== Decimal fractions ===
Decimal fractions can be added by a simple modification of the above process. One aligns two decimal fractions above each other, with the decimal point in the same location. If necessary, one can add trailing zeros to a shorter decimal to make it the same length as the longer decimal. Finally, one performs the same addition process as above, except the decimal point is placed in the answer, exactly where it was placed in the summands. As an example, 45.1 + 4.34 can be solved as follows:

   4 5 . 1 0
+  0 4 . 3 4
————————————
   4 9 . 4 4

=== Scientific notation ===
In scientific notation, numbers are written in the form $x=a\times10^{b}$, where $a$ is the significand and $10^{b}$ is the exponential part. To add numbers in scientific notation, they should be expressed with the same exponent, so that the two significands can simply be added.

For example:
$$\begin{align}
&2.34\times10^{-5} + 5.67\times10^{-6} \\
&\quad = 2.34\times10^{-5} + 0.567\times10^{-5} \\
&\quad = 2.907\times10^{-5}.
\end{align}$$

=== Non-decimal ===
In this example, two numerals are being added together: 01101_{2} (13_{10}) and 10111_{2} (23_{10}). The top row shows the carry bits used. Starting in the rightmost column, 1 + 1 = 10_{2}. The 1 is carried to the left, and the 0 is written at the bottom of the rightmost column. The second column from the right is added: 1 + 0 + 1 = 10_{2} again; the 1 is carried, and 0 is written at the bottom. The third column: 1 + 1 + 1 = 11_{2}. This time, a 1 is carried, and a 1 is written in the bottom row. Proceeding like this gives the final answer 100100_{2} (36_{10}).

Addition in other bases is very similar to decimal addition. As an example, one can consider addition in binary. Adding two single-digit binary numbers is relatively simple, using a form of carrying:
$$\begin{align}
0 + 0 &\to 0 \\
0 + 1 &\to 1 \\
1 + 0 &\to 1 \\
1 + 1 &\to 0, \qquad \text{carry 1 since } 1 + 1 = 2 = 0 + 1 \times 2^1
\end{align}$$
Adding two "1" digits produces a digit "0", while 1 must be added to the next column. This is similar to what happens in decimal when certain single-digit numbers are added together; if the result equals or exceeds the value of the radix (10), the digit to the left is incremented:
$$\begin{align}
5 + 5 &\to 0, \qquad \text{carry 1 since } 5 + 5 = 10 = 0 + 1 \times 10^1 \\
7 + 9 &\to 6, \qquad \text{carry 1 since } 7 + 9 = 16 = 6 + 1 \times 10^1
\end{align}$$

This is known as carrying. When the result of an addition exceeds the value of a digit, the procedure is to "carry" the excess amount divided by the radix (that is, 10/10) to the left, adding it to the next positional value. This is correct since the next position has a weight that is higher by a factor equal to the radix. Carrying works the same way in binary.

=== Computers ===
Addition with an op-amp. See Summing amplifier for details.

Analog computers work directly with physical quantities, so their addition mechanisms depend on the form of the addends. A mechanical adder might represent two addends as the positions of sliding blocks, in which case they can be added with an averaging lever. If the addends are the rotation speeds of two shafts, they can be added with a differential. A hydraulic adder can add the pressures in two chambers by exploiting Newton's second law to balance forces on an assembly of pistons. The most common situation for a general-purpose analog computer is to add two voltages (referenced to ground); this can be accomplished roughly with a resistor network, but a better design exploits an operational amplifier.

Addition is also fundamental to the operation of digital computers, where the efficiency of addition, in particular the carry mechanism, is an important limitation to overall performance.

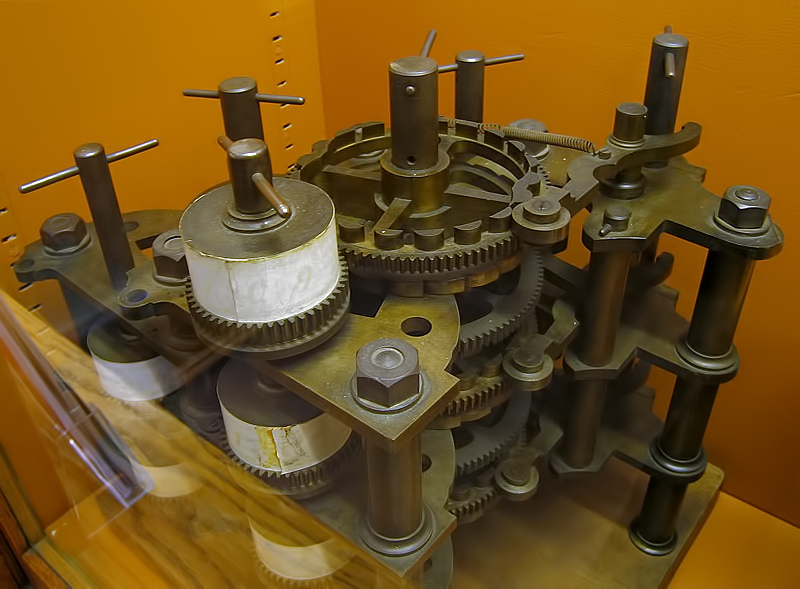
Part of Charles Babbage's Difference Engine including the addition and carry mechanisms

The abacus, also called a counting frame, is a calculating tool that was in use centuries before the adoption of the written modern numeral system and is still widely used by merchants, traders and clerks in Asia, Africa, and elsewhere; it dates back to at least 2700–2300 BC, when it was used in Sumer.

Blaise Pascal invented the mechanical calculator in 1642; it was the first operational adding machine. Pascal's calculator was limited by its gravity-assisted carry mechanism, which forced its wheels to only turn one way so it could add. To subtract, the operator had to use the Pascal's calculator's complement, which required as many steps as an addition. Gottfried Leibniz built the stepped reckoner, another mechanical calculator, finished in 1694, and Giovanni Poleni improved on the design in 1709 with a calculating clock made of wood that could perform all four arithmetical operations. These early attempts were not commercially successful but inspired later mechanical calculators of the 19th century.

"Full adder" logic circuit that adds two binary digits, A and B, along with a carry input C_{in}, producing the sum bit, S, and a carry output, C_{out}.

Adders execute integer addition in electronic digital computers, usually using binary arithmetic. The simplest architecture is the ripple carry adder, which follows the standard multi-digit algorithm. One slight improvement is the carry skip design, again following human intuition; one does not perform all the carries in computing 999 + 1, but one bypasses the group of 9s and skips to the answer.

In practice, computational addition may be achieved via XOR and AND bitwise logical operations in conjunction with bitshift operations. Both XOR and AND gates are straightforward to realize in digital logic, allowing the realization of full adder circuits, which in turn may be combined into more complex logical operations. In modern digital computers, integer addition is typically the fastest arithmetic instruction, yet it has the largest impact on performance since it underlies all floating-point operations as well as such basic tasks as address generation during memory access and fetching instructions during branching. To increase speed, modern designs calculate digits in parallel; these schemes go by such names as carry select, carry lookahead, and the Ling pseudocarry. Many implementations are, in fact, hybrids of these last three designs.

Some decimal computers in the late 1950s and early 1960s used add tables instead of adders, e.g., RCA 301, IBM 1620.

Arithmetic implemented on a computer can deviate from the mathematical ideal in various ways. For example, if the result of an addition is too large for a computer to store, an arithmetic overflow occurs, resulting in an error message and/or an incorrect answer. Unanticipated arithmetic overflow is a fairly common cause of program errors. Such overflow bugs may be hard to discover and diagnose because they may manifest themselves only for very large input data sets, which are less likely to be used in validation tests. The Year 2000 problem was a series of bugs where overflow errors occurred due to the use of a 2-digit format for years.

Computers have another way of representing numbers, called floating-point arithmetic, which is similar to the scientific notation described above and which reduces the overflow problem. Each floating point number has two parts, an exponent and a mantissa. To add two floating-point numbers, the exponents must match, which typically means shifting the mantissa of the smaller number. If the disparity between the larger and smaller numbers is too great, a loss of precision may result. If many smaller numbers are to be added to a large number, it is best to add the smaller numbers together first and then add the total to the larger number, rather than adding small numbers to the large number one at a time. This makes floating-point addition non-associative in general.

== Addition of numbers ==
To prove the usual properties of addition, one must first define addition for the context in question. Addition is first defined on the natural numbers. In set theory, addition is then extended to progressively larger sets that include the natural numbers: the integers, the rational numbers, and the real numbers. In mathematics education, (Note: This is according to a survey of the nations with highest TIMSS mathematics test scores.) positive fractions are added before negative numbers are even considered; this is also the historical route.

=== Natural numbers ===
There are two popular ways to define the sum of two natural numbers $a$ and $b$. If one defines natural numbers to be the cardinalities of finite sets (the cardinality of a set is the number of elements in the set), then it is appropriate to define their sum as follows:

Let $N(S)$ be the cardinality of a set $S$. Take two disjoint sets $A$ and $B$, with $N(A) = a$ and $N(B) = b$. Then $a + b$ is defined as $N(A \cup B)$, where $A \cup B$ means the union of $A$ and $B$..

The other popular definition is recursive:

Let $n^+$ be the successor of $n$, that is the number following $n$ in the natural numbers, so $0^+ = 1$, $1^+ = 2$. Define $a + 0 = a$. Define the general sum recursively by $a + b^+ = (a + b)^+$. Hence $1 + 1 = 1 + 0^+ = (1 + 0)^+ = 1^+ = 2$.

Again, there are minor variations upon this definition in the literature. Taken literally, the above definition is an application of the recursion theorem on the partially ordered set $\mathbb{N}^2$. On the other hand, some sources prefer to use a restricted recursion theorem that applies only to the set of natural numbers. One then considers $a$ to be temporarily "fixed", applies recursion on $b$ to define a function "$a +$", and pastes these unary operations for all $a$ together to form the full binary operation.

This recursive formulation of addition was developed by Dedekind as early as 1854, and he would expand upon it in the following decades. He proved the associative and commutative properties, among others, through mathematical induction.

=== Integers ===
The simplest conception of an integer is that it consists of an absolute value (which is a natural number) and a sign (generally either positive or negative). The integer zero is a special third case, being neither positive nor negative. The corresponding definition of addition must proceed by cases:

For an integer $n$, let $|n|$ be its absolute value. Let $a$ and $b$ be integers. If either $a$ or $b$ is zero, treat it as an identity. If $a$ and $b$ are both positive, define $a + b = |a| + |b|$. If $a$ and $b$ are both negative, define $a + b = -(|a| + |b|)$. If $a$ and $b$ have different signs, define $a + b$ to be the difference between $|a|$ and $|b|$, with the sign of the term whose absolute value is larger.

As an example, −6 + 4 = −2; because −6 and 4 have different signs, their absolute values are subtracted, and since the absolute value of the negative term is larger, the answer is negative.

Although this definition can be useful for concrete problems, the number of cases to consider complicates proofs unnecessarily. So the following method is commonly used for defining integers. It is based on the remark that every integer is the difference of two natural integers and that two such differences, $a - b$ and $c - d$ are equal if and only if $a + d = b + c$. So, one can define formally the integers as the equivalence classes of ordered pairs of natural numbers under the equivalence relation $(a,b) \sim (c,d)$ if and only if $a + d = b + c$. The equivalence class of $(a,b)$ contains either $(a-b,0)$ if $a \ge b$, or $(0,b-a)$ if otherwise. Given that $n$ is a natural number, then one can denote $+n$ the equivalence class of $(n,0)$, and by $-n$ the equivalence class of $(0,n)$. This allows identifying the natural number $n$ with the equivalence class $+n$.

The addition of ordered pairs is done component-wise:
$$(a,b) + (c,d) = (a+c, b+d).$$
A straightforward computation shows that the equivalence class of the result depends only on the equivalence classes of the summands, and thus that this defines an addition of equivalence classes, that is, integers. Another straightforward computation shows that this addition is the same as the above case definition.

=== Rational numbers (fractions) ===
Addition of rational numbers involves the fractions. The computation can be done by using the least common denominator, but a conceptually simpler definition involves only integer addition and multiplication:
$$\frac{a}{b} + \frac{c}{d} = \frac{ad+bc}{bd}.$$
As an example, the sum $\frac 34 + \frac 18 = \frac{3 \,\times\, 8 \,+\, 4 \,\times\, 1}{4 \times 8} = \frac{24 \,+\, 4}{32} = \frac{28}{32} = \frac78$.

Addition of fractions is much simpler when the denominators are the same; in this case, one can simply add the numerators while leaving the denominator the same:
$$\frac{a}{c} + \frac{b}{c} = \frac{a + b}{c},$$
so $\frac 14 + \frac 24 = \frac{1\,+\,2}{4} = \frac 34$.

The commutativity and associativity of rational addition are easy consequences of the laws of integer arithmetic.

=== Real numbers ===
A common construction of the set of real numbers is the Dedekind completion of the set of rational numbers. A real number is defined to be a Dedekind cut of rationals: a non-empty set of rationals that is closed downward and has no greatest element. The sum of real numbers a and b is defined element by element:
$$a+b = \{q+r \mid q\in a, r\in b\}.$$
This definition was first published, in a slightly modified form, by Richard Dedekind in 1872. The commutativity and associativity of real addition are immediate; defining the real number 0 as the set of negative rationals, it is easily seen as the additive identity. Probably the trickiest part of this construction pertaining to addition is the definition of additive inverses.

Adding $\pi^2/6$ and $e$ using Cauchy sequences of rationals.

Unfortunately, dealing with the multiplication of Dedekind cuts is a time-consuming case-by-case process similar to the addition of signed integers. Another approach is the metric completion of the rational numbers. A real number is essentially defined to be the limit of a Cauchy sequence of rationals, $\lim a_n$. Addition is defined term by term:
$$\lim_n a_n + \lim_n b_n = \lim_n (a_n + b_n).$$
This definition was first published by Georg Cantor, also in 1872, although his formalism was slightly different. One must prove that this operation is well-defined, dealing with co-Cauchy sequences. Once that task is done, all the properties of real addition follow immediately from the properties of rational numbers. Furthermore, the other arithmetic operations, including multiplication, have straightforward, analogous definitions.

=== Complex numbers ===
Addition of two complex numbers can be done geometrically by constructing a parallelogram.

Complex numbers are added by adding the real and imaginary parts of the summands. That is to say:
$$(a+bi) + (c+di) = (a+c) + (b+d)i.$$
Using the visualization of complex numbers in the complex plane, the addition has the following geometric interpretation: the sum of two complex numbers A and B, interpreted as points of the complex plane, is the point X obtained by building a parallelogram three of whose vertices are O, A and B.

== Generalizations ==
Many binary operations can be viewed as generalizations of the addition operation on the real numbers. The field of algebra is centrally concerned with such generalized operations, and they also appear in set theory and category theory.

=== Abelian group ===
In group theory, a group is an algebraic structure that allows for composing any two elements. In the special case where the order does not matter, the composition operator is sometimes called addition. Such groups are referred to as Abelian or commutative; the composition operator is often written as "+".

=== Linear algebra ===
In linear algebra, a vector space is an algebraic structure that allows for adding any two vectors and for scaling vectors. A familiar vector space is the set of all ordered pairs of real numbers; the ordered pair $(a,b)$ is interpreted as a vector from the origin in the Euclidean plane to the point $(a,b)$ in the plane. The sum of two vectors is obtained by adding their individual coordinates:
$$(a,b) + (c,d) = (a+c,b+d).$$
This addition operation is central to classical mechanics, in which velocities, accelerations and forces are all represented by vectors.

Matrix addition is defined for two matrices of the same dimensions. The sum of two m × n (pronounced "m by n") matrices A and B, denoted by A + B, is again an m × n matrix computed by adding corresponding elements:
$$\begin{align}
\mathbf{A}+\mathbf{B} &=
\begin{bmatrix}
a_{11} & a_{12} & \cdots & a_{1n} \\
a_{21} & a_{22} & \cdots & a_{2n} \\
\vdots & \vdots & \ddots & \vdots \\
a_{m1} & a_{m2} & \cdots & a_{mn} \\
\end{bmatrix} +
\begin{bmatrix}
b_{11} & b_{12} & \cdots & b_{1n} \\
b_{21} & b_{22} & \cdots & b_{2n} \\
\vdots & \vdots & \ddots & \vdots \\
b_{m1} & b_{m2} & \cdots & b_{mn} \\
\end{bmatrix}\\[8mu]
&= \begin{bmatrix}
a_{11} + b_{11} & a_{12} + b_{12} & \cdots & a_{1n} + b_{1n} \\
a_{21} + b_{21} & a_{22} + b_{22} & \cdots & a_{2n} + b_{2n} \\
\vdots & \vdots & \ddots & \vdots \\
a_{m1} + b_{m1} & a_{m2} + b_{m2} & \cdots & a_{mn} + b_{mn} \\
\end{bmatrix} \\
\end{align}$$

For example:
$$\begin{align}
\begin{bmatrix}
1 & 3 \\
1 & 0 \\
1 & 2
\end{bmatrix}
+
\begin{bmatrix}
0 & 0 \\
7 & 5 \\
2 & 1
\end{bmatrix}
&= \begin{bmatrix}
1+0 & 3+0 \\
1+7 & 0+5 \\
1+2 & 2+1
\end{bmatrix}\\[8mu]
&=
\begin{bmatrix}
1 & 3 \\
8 & 5 \\
3 & 3
\end{bmatrix}
\end{align}$$

In modular arithmetic, the set of available numbers is restricted to a finite subset of the integers, and addition "wraps around" when reaching a certain value, called the modulus. For example, the set of integers modulo 12 has twelve elements; it inherits an addition operation from the integers that is central to musical set theory. The set of integers modulo 2 has just two elements; the addition operation it inherits is known in Boolean logic as the "exclusive or" function. A similar "wrap around" operation arises in geometry, where the sum of two angle measures is often taken to be their sum as real numbers modulo 2π. This amounts to an addition operation on the circle, which in turn generalizes to the operations of higher-dimensional Lie groups.

The general theory of abstract algebra allows an "addition" operation to be any associative and commutative operation on a set. Basic algebraic structures with such an addition operation include commutative monoids and abelian groups.

Linear combinations combine multiplication and summation; they are sums in which each term has a multiplier, usually a real or complex number. Linear combinations are especially useful in contexts where straightforward addition would violate some normalization rule, such as mixing of strategies in game theory or superposition of states in quantum mechanics.

=== Set theory and category theory ===
A far-reaching generalization of the addition of natural numbers is the addition of ordinal numbers and cardinal numbers in set theory. These give two different generalizations of the addition of natural numbers to the transfinite. Unlike most addition operations, the addition of ordinal numbers is not commutative. Addition of cardinal numbers, however, is a commutative operation closely related to the disjoint union operation.

In category theory, disjoint union is seen as a particular case of the coproduct operation, and general coproducts are perhaps the most abstract of all the generalizations of addition. The coproduct such as direct sum is named to evoke their connection with addition.

== Related operations ==
=== Arithmetic ===
Subtraction can be thought of as a kind of addition—that is, the addition of an additive inverse. Subtraction is itself a sort of inverse to addition, in that adding $x$ and subtracting $x$ are inverse functions. Given a set with an addition operation, one cannot always define a corresponding subtraction operation on that set; the set of natural numbers is a simple example. On the other hand, a subtraction operation uniquely determines an addition operation, an additive inverse operation, and an additive identity; for this reason, an additive group can be described as a set that is closed under subtraction.

Multiplication can be thought of as repeated addition. If a single term x appears in a sum $n$ times, then the sum is the product of $n$ and x. Nonetheless, this works only for natural numbers. By the definition in general, multiplication is the operation between two numbers, called the multiplier and the multiplicand, that are combined into a single number called the product.

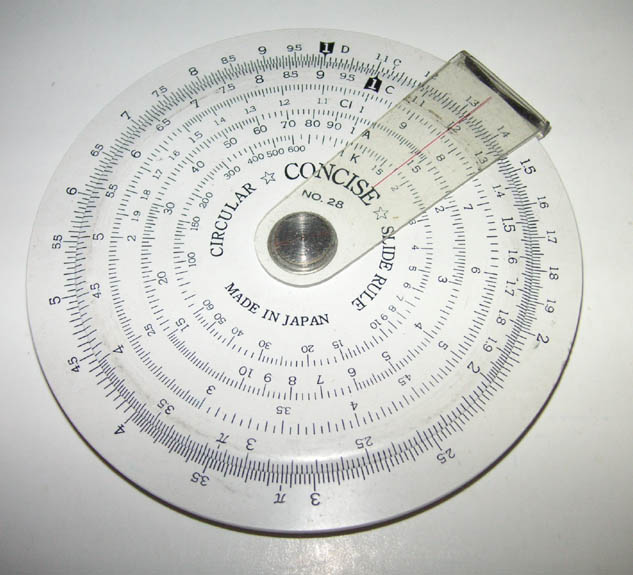
A circular slide rule

In the real and complex numbers, addition and multiplication can be interchanged by the exponential function:
$$e^{a+b} = e^a e^b.$$
This identity allows multiplication to be carried out by consulting a table of logarithms and computing addition by hand; it also enables multiplication on a slide rule. The formula is still a good first-order approximation in the broad context of Lie groups, where it relates multiplication of infinitesimal group elements with addition of vectors in the associated Lie algebra.

There are even more generalizations of multiplication than addition. In general, multiplication operations always distribute over addition; this requirement is formalized in the definition of a ring. In some contexts, integers, distributivity over addition, and the existence of a multiplicative identity are enough to determine the multiplication operation uniquely. The distributive property also provides information about the addition operation; by expanding the product $(1+1)(a+b)$ in both ways, one concludes that addition is forced to be commutative. For this reason, ring addition is commutative in general.

Division is an arithmetic operation remotely related to addition. Since $a/b = ab^{-1}$, division is right distributive over addition: $(a+b)/c = a/c + b/c$. However, division is not left distributive over addition, such as $1/(2+2)$ is not the same as $1/2 + 1/2$.

=== Ordering ===
Log-log plot of x + 1 and max (x, 1) from x = 0.001 to 1000

The maximum operation $\max(a,b)$ is a binary operation similar to addition. In fact, if two nonnegative numbers $a$ and $b$ are of different orders of magnitude, their sum is approximately equal to their maximum. This approximation is extremely useful in the applications of mathematics, for example, in truncating Taylor series. However, it presents a perpetual difficulty in numerical analysis, essentially since "max" is not invertible. If $b$ is much greater than $a$, then a straightforward calculation of $(a + b) - b$ can accumulate an unacceptable round-off error, perhaps even returning zero. See also Loss of significance.

The approximation becomes exact in a kind of infinite limit; if either $a$ or $b$ is an infinite cardinal number, their cardinal sum is exactly equal to the greater of the two. (Note: Enderton calls this statement the "Absorption Law of Cardinal Arithmetic"; it depends on the comparability of cardinals and therefore on the Axiom of Choice.) Accordingly, there is no subtraction operation for infinite cardinals.

Maximization is commutative and associative, like addition. Furthermore, since addition preserves the ordering of real numbers, addition distributes over "max" in the same way that multiplication distributes over addition:
$$a + \max(b,c) = \max(a+b,a+c).$$
For these reasons, in tropical geometry one replaces multiplication with addition and addition with maximization. In this context, addition is called "tropical multiplication", maximization is called "tropical addition", and the tropical "additive identity" is negative infinity. Some authors prefer to replace addition with minimization; then the additive identity is positive infinity.

Tying these observations together, tropical addition is approximately related to regular addition through the logarithm:
$$\log(a+b) \approx \max(\log a, \log b),$$
which becomes more accurate as the base of the logarithm increases. The approximation can be made exact by extracting a constant $h$, named by analogy with the Planck constant from quantum mechanics, and taking the "classical limit" as $h$ tends to zero:
$$\max(a,b) = \lim_{h\to 0}h\log(e^{a/h}+e^{b/h}).$$
In this sense, the maximum operation is a dequantized version of addition.

=== In probability theory ===
Convolution is used to add two independent random variables defined by distribution functions. Its usual definition combines integration, subtraction, and multiplication.

== See also ==
- Lunar arithmetic, a version of arithmetic with addition and multiplication replaced by digit-by-digit max and min
- Mental arithmetic, methods for performing addition without mechanical or written aid
- Minkowski sum, an addition operation on geometric shapes
- Parallel addition (mathematics), the reciprocal value of a sum of reciprocal values
- Prefix sum, computational problem of finding running totals
- Pythagorean addition, combining two side lengths of a right triangle to produce the length of the hypotenuse
- Verbal arithmetic (also known as cryptarithms), puzzles involving addition
- Velocity-addition formula for adding relativistic velocities
