= Ling adder =

In electronics, a Ling adder is a particularly fast binary adder designed using H. Ling's equations. Samuel Naffziger of Hewlett-Packard presented an innovative 64 bit adder in 0.5 μm CMOS based on Ling's equations at ISSCC 1996. The Naffziger adder's delay was less than 1 nanosecond, or 7 FO4.

== Equations ==
=== Ling adder, architecture Skllansky, radix-2, 4-bit ===
In Borland Turbo Basic 1.1:

'--- Step 0 ------------ Warning ---------------------------------------
P00 = A0 OR  B0    '1dt, Initial only CLA & Ling Propagate (not in PPA)
G00 = A0 AND B0    '1dt, Initial CLA & Ling & PPA Generate
D00 = A0 XOR B0    '1dt, Only Ling Initial half bit generate (P0 in PPA)

P10 = A1 OR  B1    '1dt
G10 = A1 AND B1    '1dt
D10 = A1 XOR B1    '1dt

P20 = A2 OR  B2    '1dt
G20 = A2 AND B2    '1dt
D20 = A2 XOR B2    '1dt

P30 = A3 OR  B3    '1dt
G30 = A3 AND B3    '1dt
D30 = A3 XOR B3    '1dt

'--- Step 1, Ling Propagate and Generate ------
LG01 = G00          '1dt
LG11 = G10 OR  G00  '2dt

LP11 = P10          '1dt, Sklansky architecture
LG21 = G20          '1dt, Sklansky architecture

LP21 = P20 AND P10  '2dt
LG31 = G30 OR  G20  '2dt

'--- Step 2, Ling PseudoCarry (H) ---------------------------
H0 = LG01                     '1dt
H1 = LG11                     '2dt
H2 = LG21 OR (LP11 AND LG11)  '4dt TTL, Sklansky architecture
'    1dt      1dt      2dt
H3 = LG31 OR (LP21 AND LG11)  '4dt TTL
'    2dt      2dt      2dt
'--- Sum -----------------------------------------
S0 = (D00         )                           '1dt
S1 = (D10 AND 1-H0) OR ((D10 XOR P00) AND H0) '4dt TTL
S2 = (D20 AND 1-H1) OR ((D20 XOR P10) AND H1) '5dt TTL
S3 = (D30 AND 1-H2) OR ((D30 XOR P20) AND H2) '7dt TTL
S4 =                   ((        P30) AND H3) '5dt TTL, S4=C4=Cout 
[2]

=== Ling adder, architecture Kogge-Stone, radix-2, 4-bit ===
'--- Step 0 ------------ Warning ---------------------------------------
P00 = A0 OR  B0    '1dt, Initial only CLA & Ling Propagate (not in PPA)
G00 = A0 AND B0    '1dt, Initial CLA & Ling & PPA Generate
D00 = A0 XOR B0    '1dt, Only Ling Initial half bit generate (P0 in PPA)

P10 = A1 OR  B1    '1dt
G10 = A1 AND B1    '1dt
D10 = A1 XOR B1    '1dt

P20 = A2 OR  B2    '1dt
G20 = A2 AND B2    '1dt
D20 = A2 XOR B2    '1dt

P30 = A3 OR  B3    '1dt
G30 = A3 AND B3    '1dt
D30 = A3 XOR B3    '1dt

'--- Step 1 ----------------------------
LG01 = G00          '1dt, Ling Generate

LP11 = P10 AND P00  '2dt, Ling Propagate, Kogge-Stone architecture
LG11 = G10 OR  G00  '2dt

LP21 = P20 AND P10  '2dt
LG21 = G20 OR  G10  '2dt, Kogge-Stone architecture

LG31 = G30 OR  G20  '2dt

'--- Step 2, Ling PseudoCarry ----
H0 = LG01                     '1dt
H1 = LG11                     '2dt
H2 = LG21 OR (LP11 AND LG01)  '4dt TTL, Kogge-Stone architecture
'    2dt      2dt      1dt
H3 = LG31 OR (LP21 AND LG11)  '4dt TTL
'    2dt      2dt      2dt
'--- Sum -----------------------------------------
S0 = (D00         )                           '1dt
S1 = (D10 AND 1-H0) OR ((D10 XOR P00) AND H0) '4dt TTL
S2 = (D20 AND 1-H1) OR ((D20 XOR P10) AND H1) '5dt TTL
S3 = (D30 AND 1-H2) OR ((D30 XOR P20) AND H2) '7dt TTL
S4 =                  ((         P30) AND H3) '5dt TTL, S4=C4=Cout
[3]
