= Extensive category =

Type of category in mathematics

In mathematics, an extensive category is a category C with finite coproducts that are disjoint and well-behaved with respect to pullbacks. Equivalently, C is extensive if the coproduct functor from the product of the slice categories C/X × C/Y to the slice category C/(X + Y) is an equivalence of categories for all objects X and Y of C.

== Examples ==
The categories Set and Top of sets and topological spaces, respectively, are extensive categories. More generally, the category of presheaves on any small category is extensive.

The category CRing^{op} of affine schemes is extensive.
