= Multiplication and repeated addition =

Debate on mathematics education

In mathematics education, there was a debate on the issue of whether the operation of multiplication should be taught as being a form of repeated addition. Participants in the debate brought up multiple perspectives, including axioms of arithmetic, pedagogy, learning and instructional design, history of mathematics, philosophy of mathematics, and computer-based mathematics.

== Background of the debate ==
In the early 1990s Leslie Steffe proposed the counting scheme children use to assimilate multiplication into their mathematical knowledge. Jere Confrey contrasted the counting scheme with the splitting conjecture. Confrey suggested that counting and splitting are two separate, independent cognitive primitives. This sparked academic discussions in the form of conference presentations, articles and book chapters.

The debate originated with the wider spread of curricula that emphasized scaling, zooming, folding and measuring mathematical tasks in the early years. Such tasks both require and support models of multiplication that are not based on counting or repeated addition. Debates around the question, "Is multiplication really repeated addition?" appeared on parent and teacher discussion forums in the mid-1990s.

Keith Devlin wrote a Mathematical Association of America column titled, "It Ain't No Repeated Addition" that followed up on his email exchanges with teachers, after he mentioned the topic briefly in an earlier article. The column linked the academic debates with practitioner debates. It sparked multiple discussions in research, and practitioner blogs and forums. Keith Devlin has continued to write on this topic.

== Pedagogical perspectives ==
=== From counting to multiplication ===
In typical mathematics curricula and standards, such as the Common Core State Standards Initiative, the meaning of the product of real numbers steps through a series of notions generally beginning with repeated addition and ultimately residing in scaling.

Once the natural (or whole) numbers have been defined, and understood as a means to count, a child is introduced to the basic operations of arithmetic, in this order: addition, subtraction, multiplication and division. These operations, although introduced at a very early stage of a child's mathematics education, have a lasting impact on the development of number sense in students as advanced numeric abilities.

In these curricula, multiplication is introduced immediately after posing questions related to repeated addition, such as: "There are 3 bags of 8 apples each. How many apples are there in all? A student can do:

$$8 + 8 + 8 = 24,$$

or choose the alternative

$$3 \times 8 = 24.$$

This approach is supported for several years of teaching and learning, and sets up the perception that multiplication is just a more efficient way of adding. Once 0 is brought in, it affects no significant change because

$$3 \times 0 = 0 + 0 + 0,$$

which is 0, and the commutative property would lead us also to define

$$0 \times 3 = 0.$$

Thus, repeated addition extends to the whole numbers (0, 1, 2, 3, 4, ...). The first challenge to the belief that multiplication is repeated addition appears when students start working with fractions. From the mathematical point of view, multiplication as repeated addition can be extended into fractions. For example,

$$\frac 7 4 \times \frac 5 6$$

literally calls for “one and three-fourths of the five-sixths.” This is later significant because students are taught that, in word problems, the word “of” usually indicates a multiplication. However, this extension is problematic for many students, who start struggling with mathematics when fractions are introduced . Moreover, the repeated addition model must be substantially modified when irrational numbers are brought into play.

Concerning these issues, mathematics educators have debated whether student difficulties with fractions and irrational numbers are exacerbated by viewing multiplication as repeated addition for a long time before these numbers are introduced, and relatedly whether it is acceptable to significantly modify rigorous mathematics for elementary education, leading children to believe statements that later turn out to be incorrect.

=== From scaling to multiplication ===
Multiplication can also be thought of as scaling. In the above animation, we see 3 being multiplied by 2, giving 6 as a result.

One theory of learning multiplication derives from the work of the Russian mathematics educators in the Vygotsky Circle which was active in the Soviet Union between the world wars. Their contribution is known as the splitting conjecture.

Another theory of learning multiplication derives from those studying embodied cognition, which examined the underlying metaphors for multiplication.

Together these investigations have inspired curricula with "inherently multiplicative" tasks for young children. Examples of these tasks include: elastic stretching, zoom, folding, projecting shadows, or dropping shadows. These tasks don't depend on counting, and cannot be easily conceptualized in terms of repeated addition.

Issues of debate related to these curricula include:

- whether these tasks are accessible to all young children, or only to the best students;
- whether children can achieve computational fluency if they see multiplication as scaling rather than repeated addition;
- whether children may become confused by the two separate approaches to multiplication introduced closely together; and
- whether scaling and repeated addition should be introduced separately, and if so, when and in what order?

=== What can be multiplied? ===
Multiplication is often defined for natural numbers, then extended to whole numbers, fractions, and irrational numbers. However, abstract algebra has a more general definition of multiplication as a binary operation on some objects that may or may not be numbers. Notably, one can multiply complex numbers, vectors, matrices, and quaternions. Some educators believe that seeing multiplication exclusively as repeated addition during elementary education can interfere with later understanding of these aspects of multiplication.

== Models and metaphors that ground multiplication ==
In the context of mathematics education, models are concrete representations of abstract mathematical ideas that reflect some, or all, essential qualities of the idea. Models are often developed as physical or virtual manipulatives and curricular materials that accompany them.

A part of the debate about multiplication and repeated addition is the comparison of different models and their curricular materials. Different models may or may not support multiplication of different types of numbers; for instance the set model in which numbers are presented as collections of objects, and multiplication as the union of multiple sets with the same number of objects in each, cannot be extended to multiplication of fractional or real numbers.

Different models may also be relevant to specific applications of arithmetic; for example, combination models come up in probability and biology.
