= Additive identity =

Value that makes no change when added

In mathematics, the additive identity of a set that is equipped with the operation of addition is an element which, when added to any element x in the set, yields x. One of the most familiar additive identities is the number 0 from elementary mathematics, but additive identities occur in other mathematical structures where addition is defined, such as in groups and rings.

== Elementary examples ==
- The additive identity familiar from elementary mathematics is zero, denoted 0. For example,
  $$5+0 = 5 = 0+5.$$
- In the natural numbers $\N$ (if 0 is included), the integers $\Z,$ the rational numbers $\Q,$ the real numbers $\R,$ and the complex numbers $\C,$ the additive identity is 0. This says that for a number n belonging to any of these sets,
  $$n+0 = n = 0+n.$$

== Formal definition ==
Let N be a group that is closed under the operation of addition, denoted +. An additive identity for N, denoted e, is an element in N such that for any element n in N,
$$e+n = n = n+e.$$

== Further examples ==
- In a group, the additive identity is the identity element of the group, is often denoted 0, and is unique (see below for proof).
- A ring or field is a group under the operation of addition and thus these also have a unique additive identity 0. This is defined to be different from the multiplicative identity 1 if the ring (or field) has more than one element. If the additive identity and the multiplicative identity are the same, then the ring is trivial (proved below).
- In the ring M_{m × n}(R) of m-by-n matrices over a ring R, the additive identity is the zero matrix, denoted O or 0, and is the m-by-n matrix whose entries consist entirely of the identity element 0 in R. For example, in the 2×2 matrices over the integers $\operatorname{M}_2(\Z)$ the additive identity is
  $$0 = \begin{bmatrix}0 & 0 \\ 0 & 0\end{bmatrix}$$
- In the quaternions, 0 is the additive identity.
- In the ring of functions from $\R \to \R$, the function mapping every number to 0 is the additive identity.
- In the additive group of vectors in $\R^n,$ the origin or zero vector is the additive identity.

== Properties ==
=== The additive identity is unique in a group ===
Let (G, +) be a group and let 0 and 0' in G both denote additive identities, so for any g in G,
$$0+g = g = g+0, \qquad 0'+g = g = g+0'.$$

It then follows from the above that
$${\color{green}0'} = {\color{green}0'} + 0 = 0' + {\color{red}0} = {\color{red}0}.$$

=== The additive identity annihilates ring elements ===
In a system with a multiplication operation that distributes over addition, the additive identity is a multiplicative absorbing element, meaning that for any s in S, s · 0 = 0. This follows because:

$$\begin{align}
s \cdot 0 &= s \cdot (0 + 0) = s \cdot 0 + s \cdot 0 \\
\Rightarrow s \cdot 0 &= s \cdot 0 - s \cdot  0 \\
\Rightarrow s \cdot 0 &= 0.
\end{align}$$

=== The additive and multiplicative identities are different in a non-trivial ring ===
Let R be a ring and suppose that the additive identity 0 and the multiplicative identity 1 are equal, i.e. 0 = 1. Let r be any element of R. Then
$$r = r \times 1 = r \times 0 = 0$$
proving that R is trivial, i.e. R = {0}. The contrapositive, that if R is non-trivial then 0 is not equal to 1, is therefore shown.

== See also ==
- 0 (number)
- Additive inverse
- Identity element
- Multiplicative identity

== Bibliography ==
- David S. Dummit, Richard M. Foote, Abstract Algebra, Wiley (3rd ed.): 2003, ISBN 0-471-43334-9.
