= Annihilation (disambiguation) =

Annihilation, in physics, is an effect that occurs when a particle collides with an antiparticle.

Annihilation may also refer to:

== Arts, entertainment, and media ==
=== Comics ===
- Annihilation (comics), a Marvel Comics 2006 event featuring several cosmic characters
  - Annihilation: Conquest, a 2007 series featuring similar themes and marketed as a sequel of the above comic book series

=== Literature ===
- Annihilation (Forgotten Realms novel), a 2004 novel by Philip Athans set in the Forgotten Realms universe
- Annihilation (VanderMeer novel), a 2014 novel by Jeff VanderMeer and the first entry in the Southern Reach Trilogy
- Annihilation (Houellebecq novel), a 2022 novel by Michel Houellebecq

=== Films ===
- Annihilation (film), a 2018 film based on Jeff VanderMeer's novel of the same name
- Mortal Kombat Annihilation, the sequel to Mortal Kombat

=== Games ===
- Annihilation, a map pack for Call of Duty: Black Ops

=== Music ===
- Annihilation (album), 2001 Rebaelliun album
- "Annihilate" (song), a 2023 song by Metro Boomin, Swae Lee, Lil Wayne and Offset
- "Annihilation", a song from the album Dehumanization by Crucifix
- "Annihilation", 2026 song by Starset
- "Annihilation", a 2026 song by Holly Humberstone from the album Cruel World... So It Ends

== Law ==
- Family annihilation, the act of killing everyone in a family.

== Logic and mathematics ==
- Annihilation, an operation in classical logic
- Creation and annihilation operators, mathematical operators utilized in the field of quantum mechanics

== See also ==
- "Annihilated", an episode from Law & Order: Special Victims Unit (season 8)
- Annihilating element
- Annihilationism, a minority Christian doctrine that the unsaved cease to exist rather than suffering conscious eternal torment in Hell
- Annihilator (disambiguation)
