= Weaponize =

Weaponize may refer to:

- using anything as a weapon

== Music ==
- Weaponize, album by Kay Hanley 2008
- "Weaponize", song by Pegboard Nerds
- "Weaponize", song by Rebaelliun
