= Rebaelliun =

Brazilian death metal band

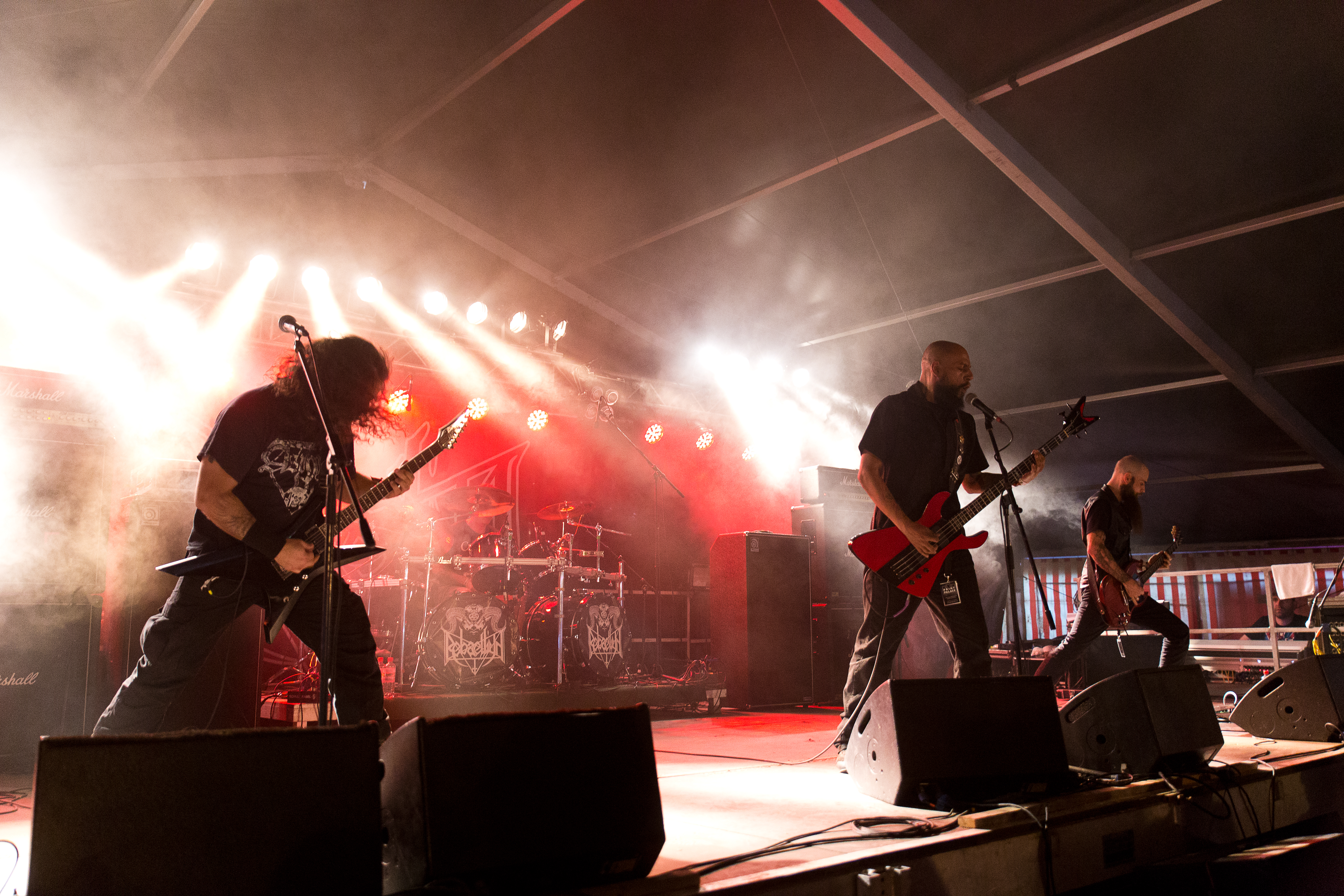
- Rebaelliun at Party.San 2016

Background information
- Origin: Porto Alegre, Rio Grande do Sul, Brazil
- Genre: Death metal
- Years active: 1998–2002; 2015–present
- Label: Hammerheart
- Members: Sandro Moreira; Evandro Passos; Bruno Añaña
- Past members: Fabiano Penna; Ronaldo Lima; Marcello Marzari; Lohy Fabiano

Rebaelliun is a Brazilian death metal band formed in 1998. Their style is similar to Krisiun. Following the release of their promotional tape, the band signed with Dutch label Hammerheart Records, which released their debut album, Burn the Promised Land, in 1999. The album's release was followed by a European tour.

== History ==
The band recorded the EP Bringer of War, which included a cover of Morbid Angel. Shortly after, they released a second album, Annihilation, followed by another European tour. Various issues led to the band's dissolution in 2001. After a 13-year hiatus, Rebaelliun announced its return in 2015.

According to a statement on his official personal page, Fabiano Penna (guitarist and founding member) confirmed that Rebaelliun had reunited with all original members to "write a new chapter of brutality" in the band's history. A third album and a worldwide tour were planned for 2016, as reported by the Metalmedia website. The Metallian encyclopedia noted that the members had discussed reuniting over the years.

He said , "It’s been a long time, and now I want to share this news: me, Lohy, Sandro, and Ronaldo have finally decided to reunite again to write a new chapter in the history of Rebaelliun! We will prepare our third album and consequently play a tour to promote it in 2016, among other plans we have. I would like to thank for all the endless support we have received from people from many countries in the last years, people who’s always asking and talking about this reunion, and that kept our name alive after so long. It would be impossible to name all of you here, but you know who you are. More news soon. At war!!"

Fabiano Penna Corrêa (guitars) was involved with Brazilian death/black metal band Horned God, with whom he released an album through French label Listenable Records. A few years later, he formed The Ordher with Nephasth members Fabio Lentino and Mauricio Weimar, releasing their debut album, Weaponize, on October 23, 2007, via Unique Leader Records. Poland's Empire Records licensed the album and released it in late March 2008. Penna later resumed playing for Rebaelliun.

Sandro Moreira (drums) joined Brazilian death metal band Mental Horror. He played drums on their third and most successful album, Blemished Redemption, released in 2007. The album was issued through Mutilation Records in Brazil, with Germany's Animate Records handling the vinyl release, while Poland's Empire Records licensed and released the album in mid-August 2007. Moreira subsequently returned to Rebaelliun.

Marcello Marzari (vocals/bass) worked for the tattoo and piercing company Renegade Studio. It is unclear whether he continued this occupation after leaving Rebaelliun prior to the release of their 2001 album Annihilation. Marzari later joined Brazilian death metal band Abhorrence, signed to Listenable Records.

Lohy Fabiano and Ronaldo Lima were quiet until Fabiano Penna announced the band's 2015 reunion and the 2016 release of The Hell's Decrees.

On February 27, 2018, it was announced that guitarist Fabiano Penna had died.

In July 2021, Rebaelliun announced that they had begun recording a new album, expected to be released in 2022.

On June 3, 2022, vocalist and bassist Lohy Fabiano died of cardio-respiratory arrest. A month later, the band announced Bruno Añaña as his replacement.

== Members ==
Current

- Sandro Moreira – drums (1998–2002, 2015–present)
- Evandro Passos – guitars, backing vocals (2018–present)
- Bruno Añaña – bass, vocals (2022–present)

Former

- Fabiano Penna – guitars, backing vocals (1998–2002, 2015–2018) (died 2018)
- Ronaldo Lima – guitars (1998–2002, 2015–2016)
- Marcello Marzari – bass, vocals (1998–2000)
- Lohy Fabiano – bass, vocals (2000–2002, 2015–2022) (died 2022)

Timeline

== Discography ==
=== Studio albums ===
- Burn the Promised Land (2000)
- Annihilation (2001)
- The Hell's Decrees (2016)
- Under the Sign Of Rebellion (2023)

=== Extended plays ===
- At War (1999)
- Bringer of War (2000)

== See also ==
- Krisiun
- Mental Horror
- Torture Squad
