= Annihilation (album) =

Studio album by Rebaelliun
- Released: September 24, 2001
- Recorded: February–March 2001 at Stage One Studio, Germany
- Genre: Death metal
- Length: 38:05
- Label: Hammerheart
- Producers: Andy Classen, Rebaelliun

Rebaelliun chronology
| Bringer of War (2000) | Annihilation (2001) |

Professional ratings
Review scores
| Source | Rating |
|---|---|
| Global Domination | (7.5/10) |
| Kerrang! | 4/5 stars |

Annihilation is an album by the Brazilian death metal band Rebaelliun. It was released in 2001 by Hammerheart Records.

== Track listing ==
1. "Annihilation" – 5:00
2. "Rebellious Vengeance" – 4:28
3. "Steel Siege" – 3:41
4. "Red Spikes" – 3:21
5. "Unleash the Fire" – 5:05
6. "Unborn Consecration" – 4:53
7. "God of a Burned Land" – 3:59
8. "Bringer of War" – 4:23
9. "Defying the Plague" – 3:15

== Personnel ==
- Lohy Fabiano – bass, vocals
- Fabiano Penna Corrêa – guitar
- Ronaldo Lima – guitar
- Sandro Moreira – drums
- Andy Classen – producer
- Schosch Classen – sound engineer
- Rob Essers – mastering engineer
