= Aric Hagberg =

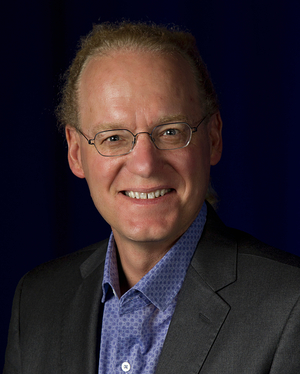
- Aric Hagberg, Applied Mathematician at Los Alamos National Laboratory
- Education: University of Arizona
- Known for: NetworkX
- Scientific career
- Workplaces: Los Alamos National Laboratory
- Thesis: Fronts and Patterns in Reaction-Diffusion Equations (1994)
- Website: aric.hagberg.org

Aric Hagberg is an American applied mathematician and academic, working in nonlinear dynamics, pattern formation and complex systems. He is the division leader of the computer, computational, and statistical sciences division at Los Alamos National Laboratory.

He was educated at the University of Arizona (PhD, 1994).

Aric is also one of the authors of the NetworkX package.
