= Annihilator =

Annihilator(s) may refer to:

== Mathematics ==
- Annihilator (ring theory)
- Annihilator (linear algebra), the annihilator of a subset of a vector subspace
- Annihilator method, a type of differential operator, used in a particular method for solving differential equations
- Annihilator matrix, in regression analysis

== Music ==
- Annihilator (band), a Canadian heavy metal band
  - Annihilator (album), a 2010 album by the aforementioned band

== Other media ==
- Annihilator (Justice League), an automaton in the fictional series Justice League Unlimited
- Annihilators (Marvel Comics), a team of superheroes
- Annihilator, a 2015 science fiction comic by Grant Morrison and Frazer Irving
- Annihilator (film), a 1986 television film starring Mark Lindsay Chapman
- The Annihilators (film), a 1985 action film by Charles E. Sellier Jr.
- The Annihilators (novel), a 1983 novel by Donald Hamilton
- "Annihilator" (Prodigal Son), a 2019 television episode

== See also ==
- Annihilation (disambiguation)
- Annihilating element
