= Bringer of War =

EP by Rebaelliun
- Released: 2000
- Genre: Death metal
- Label: Hammerheart

Bringer of War is an EP by Rebaelliun that was released in 2000 by Hammerheart Records.

== Track listing ==
1. "Agonizing by My Hands"
2. "Bringer of War"
3. "Kings of Unholy Blood"
4. "Day of Suffering" (Morbid Angel Cover)

== Credits ==
- Sandro Moreira: Drums
- Marcello Marzari: Bass/Vocals
- Fabiano Penna: Guitars
