= Mental Horror =

Brazilian brutal death metal band

- Origin: Porto Alegre, Rio Grande do Sul, Brazil
- Genre: Brutal death metal
- Years active: 1993–present
- Labels: DeathVomit, Necropolis, Mutilation
- Members: Adriano Martini; Marcelo Feijó; Iuri Ravel; Marcos Seixas
- Past members: Aires; Claudio Cardoso; Alex Martins; Geber; Rafael Lavandoski; Sandro Moreira; Robles Dresch

Mental Horror is a Brazilian brutal death metal band formed in Porto Alegre, in 1993. In 1998, the band recorded the demo Extreme Evolution Trauma. In 2000, the band signed with Necropolis Records. In 2001, they released their debut studio album, Proclaiming Vengeance, on Necropolis. The albums Abyss of Hypocrisy and Blemished Redemption followed in 2004 and 2006, respectively.

== Members ==
=== Current members ===
- Adriano Martini – guitar, keyboard, vocals
- Marcelo Feijó – bass
- Iuri Ravel – drums
- Marcos Seixas – guitar

=== Former members ===
- Aires – guitar
- Claudio Cardoso – vocals
- Alex Martins – drums
- Geber – bass
- Rafael Lavandoski - guitar
- Iuri Ravel - drums
- Robles Dresch – drums
- Sandro Moreira – drums

== Discography ==
=== Studio albums ===
- Proclaiming Vengeance (2000)
- Abyss of Hypocrisy (2004)
- Blemished Redemption (2006)
