= Absorbing element =

Special type of element of a set

In mathematics, an absorbing element (or annihilating element) is a special type of element of a set with respect to a binary operation on that set. The result of combining an absorbing element with any element of the set is the absorbing element itself. In semigroup theory, the absorbing element is called a zero element because there is no risk of confusion with other notions of zero, with the notable exception: under additive notation zero may, quite naturally, denote the neutral element of a monoid. In this article "zero element" and "absorbing element" are synonymous.

== Definition ==
Formally, let $(S,*)$ be a set $S$ with a closed binary operation $*$ on it (known as a magma). A zero element (or an absorbing/annihilating element) is an element $z$ such that for all $s$ in $S$, $z*s=s*z=z$. This notion can be refined to the notions of left zero, where one requires only that $z*s=z$, and right zero, where $s*z=z$.

Absorbing elements are particularly interesting for semigroups, especially the multiplicative semigroup of a semiring. In the case of a semiring with $0$, the definition of an absorbing element is sometimes relaxed so that it is not required to absorb $0$; otherwise, $0$ would be the only absorbing element.

== Properties ==
- If a magma has both a left zero $z$ and a right zero $z'$, then it has a zero, since $z=z*z'=z'$.
- A magma can have at most one zero element.

== Examples ==
- The most well known example of an absorbing element comes from elementary algebra, where any number multiplied by zero equals zero. Zero is thus an absorbing element.
- The zero of any ring is also an absorbing element. For an element $r$ of a ring $R$, $r0=r(0+0)=r0+r0$, so $0=r0$, as zero is the unique element $a$ for which $r-r=a$ for any $r$ in the ring $R$. This property holds true also in a rng since multiplicative identity isn't required.
- Floating point arithmetics as defined in IEEE-754 standard contains a special value called Not-a-Number ($\mathrm{NaN}$). It is an absorbing element for every operation; i.e., $x+\mathrm{NaN}=\mathrm{NaN}+x=\mathrm{NaN}$, $x-\mathrm{NaN}=\mathrm{NaN}-x=\mathrm{NaN}$, etc.
- The set of binary relations over a set $X$, together with the composition of relations forms a monoid with zero, where the zero element is the empty relation (empty set).
- The closed interval $H=[0,1]$ with $x*y=\min(x,y)$ is also a monoid with zero, and the zero element is $0$.
- More examples:

Domain	Operation		Absorber	
real numbers	$\cdot$	multiplication	0	
integers	$\gcd$	greatest common divisor	1	
$n$-by-$n$ square matrices		matrix multiplication		matrix of all zeroes
extended real numbers	$\min,\inf$	minimum/infimum	$-\infty$	
extended real numbers	$\max,\sup$	maximum/supremum	$+\infty$	
sets	$\cap$	intersection	$\varnothing$	empty set
subsets of a set $M$	$\cup$	union	$M$	
Boolean logic	$\land$	logical and	$\bot$	falsity
Boolean logic	$\lor$	logical or	$\top$	truth

== See also ==
- Absorbing set – Set that can be "inflated" to reach any point
- Annihilator (disambiguation)
- Annihilator (ring theory) – Ideal that maps to zero a subset of a module
- Ideal (ring theory)
- Idempotent (ring theory) – In mathematics, element that equals its square – an element $x$ of a ring such that $x^2=x$
- Identity element – Specific element of an algebraic structure
- Null semigroup
