= Wall Street Journal Dollar Index =

Index of the value of the U. S. dollar

The Wall Street Journal Dollar Index (WSJ Dollar Index) is an index (or measure) of the value of the U.S. dollar relative to 16 foreign currencies.

The index is weighted using data provided by the Bank for International Settlements (BIS) on total foreign exchange (FX) trading volume. The index rises when the U.S. dollar gains value against the other currencies, and falls when the U.S. dollar loses value against the currencies.

The methodology and data used for the index set it apart from several existing metrics, such as the ICE U.S. Dollar Index, Dow Jones FXCM Dollar Index and FTSE Curex USD/G8 Index. The WSJ Dollar Index is a trade weighted index but unlike some of the other metrics, the WSJ Dollar Index captures the impact of capital flows on currency volumes, a significant determinant of currency market activity.

== History ==
The WSJ Dollar index was created in 2012 with the aim of improving on the previous US Dollar indices by using a different calculation and more currencies. The Wall Street Journal issued a press release for the index on July 18, 2012.

The index was developed by Stephen Bernard and Vincent Cignarella, at the time members of the news team for Dow Jones, the Wall Street Journal and DJ FX Trader, a joint product of Dow Jones & Co. and The Wall Street Journal. Bernard and Cignarella discussed the index launch on WSJ.com's Markets Hub. The pair also wrote about the index for The Wall Street Journal and WSJ.com.

== Components and methodology ==
The triennial foreign exchange turnover survey published by the BIS provides the basis for weighting the WSJ Dollar Index.

The BIS includes data on major currency pairs as defined by the organization's most recent triennial report (currency pairs they break out as individual pairs, which has grown in each successive report). Each dollar pair that constitutes at least 1% of global currency turnover is included in the index, and weighted based on their proportion of volume within the group of currency pairs used in the index.

The index was updated in December 2013 with the release of the latest survey. The index now includes 16 dollar currency pairs, up from seven in the previous iteration. Mexico's peso, China's yuan, Russia's ruble, Turkey's lira, South Korea's won, South Africa's rand and New Zealand's, Hong Kong's and Singapore's dollars are now all included in the index for the first time.

The 16 currencies used in the index accounted for 80% of the $5.3 trillion daily trading in global foreign exchange markets.

Initially at launch, the WSJ Dollar Index tracked seven foreign currencies, including the euro (EUR), yen (JPY), pound sterling (GBP), Australian dollar (AUD), Swiss franc (CHF), Canadian dollar (CAD), and Swedish krona (SEK). All seven currencies remain in the current version of the index. Combined the seven currency pairs accounted for more than two-thirds of daily global foreign exchange trading volume at the time the index was initially launched.

The index is re-weighted after the close on the first Friday following the release of the BIS’s triennial survey. The latest triennial survey was published in September 2019. The WSJ Dollar Index differs from the other metrics in that the index is consistently updated every three years.

== See also ==
- U.S. Dollar Index
- Trade-weighted US dollar index
- Trade-weighted effective exchange rate index
