= List of commodity booms =

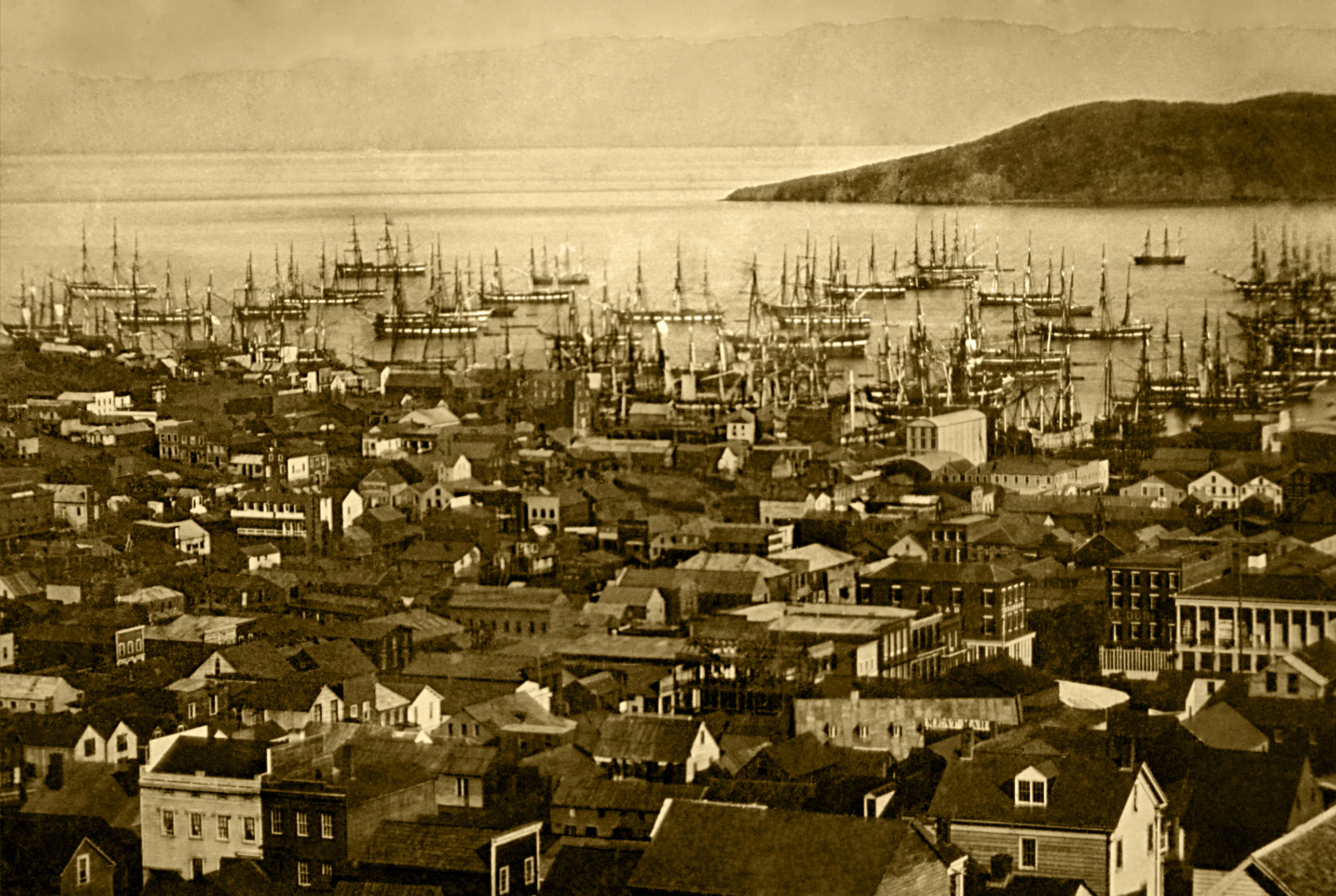
Merchant ships fill San Francisco harbor, 1850–51.

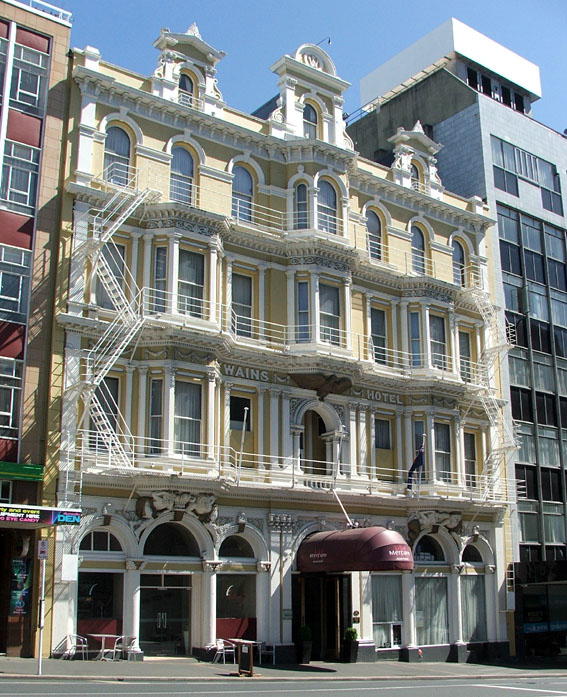
The stately Victorian architecture of Dunedin, New Zealand, is a result of the capital brought into the city by the Otago gold rush of the 1860s.

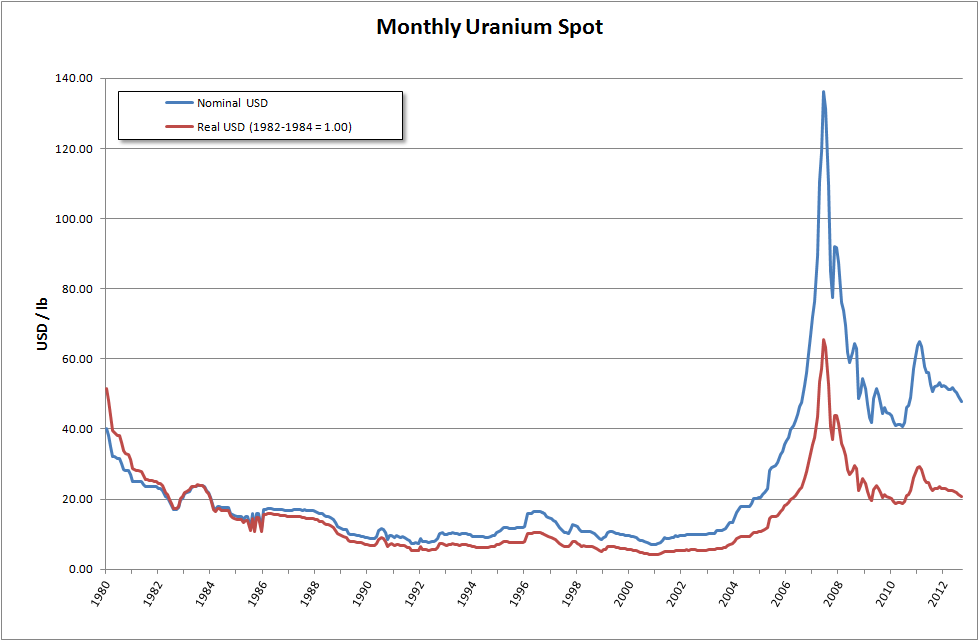
Uranium bubble of 2007

This is a list of economic booms created by physical commodities.

Boom	Commodity	Type	Location	Dates
First Chilean wheat cycle	wheat	agricultural	Chile	1687–1810
Brazilian Gold Rush	gold	metal	Brazil	18th century
Carolina gold rush	gold	metal	North Carolina, US	early 19th century
Georgia Gold Rush	gold	metal	Georgia, US	1828 – early 1840s
Chilean silver rush	silver	metal	Chile	1832 – c. 1855
Chilean copper boom	copper	metal	Chile	1850 – c. 1875
Guano Era	guano	hard commodity	Peru	1845 – c. 1870
California gold rush	gold	metal	California, US	1848–1855
Second Chilean wheat cycle	wheat	agricultural	Chile	1849 – 1870s
British Columbia gold rushes	gold	metal	British Columbia, Canada	1850–1941
Australian gold rushes	gold	metal	Australia	1851–1906
Pennsylvania oil rush	petroleum	fossil fuel	northwestern Pennsylvania, US	1859 – early 1870s
Otago gold rush	gold	metal	Central Otago, New Zealand	1860s
Colorado River mining boom	gold	metal	Southwestern US	1861–64
West Coast gold rush	gold	metal	West Coast, New Zealand	1864–1867
Lapland gold rush	gold	metal	Lapland, Finland	1870s
Azerbaijan oil boom	petroleum	fossil fuel	Azerbaijan	1870s
Black Hills gold rush	gold	metal	Dakota Territory, US	1874 – c. 1880
Patagonian sheep farming boom	wool, mutton	agricultural	Patagonia	1878 – 1920
Coromandel Gold Rushes	gold	metal	Coromandel Peninsula, New Zealand	1870s – 1880s
Cripple Creek Gold Rush	gold	metal	Cripple Creek, Colorado, US	late 19th to early 20th century
Bodie gold rush	gold	metal	Bodie, California, US	1877–1880
First Amazon rubber boom	rubber	agricultural	Amazon basin	1879–1912
Colorado Silver Boom	silver	metal	Colorado, US	1879–1893
Canadian wheat boom	wheat	agricultural	Canada, especially Prairie Provinces	c. 1880 – 1910, and 1914 – 1921
Indiana gas boom	natural gas	fossil fuel	Indiana, US	early 1880s – early 20th century
Ohio oil rush	petroleum	fossil fuel	Northwest Ohio, US	1880s – 1930s
Tierra del Fuego gold rush	gold	metal	Tierra del Fuego	1883–1906
Witwatersrand Gold Rush	gold	metal	South Africa	1886
Klondike Gold Rush	gold	metal	Klondike, Yukon, Canada	1896–1899
Mount Baker gold rush	gold	metal	Whatcom County, Washington, US	1897 – mid-1920s
Nome Gold Rush	gold	metal	Nome, Alaska, US	1899–1909
Fairbanks Gold Rush	gold	metal	Fairbanks, Alaska, US	early 1900s
Texas oil boom	petroleum	fossil fuel	Texas, US	1901 – 1940s
Cobalt silver rush	silver	metal	Cobalt, Ontario, Canada	1903 – c. 1930
Stoy, Illinois oil boom	petroleum	fossil fuel	Stoy, Illinois, US	1906–1910
Porcupine Gold Rush	gold	metal	Northern Ontario, Canada	1909 – 1950s
Kakamega gold rush	gold	metal	Kakamega, Kenya	early 1930s
Vatukoula gold rush	gold	metal	Vatukoula, Fiji	1932
Second Amazon rubber boom	rubber	agricultural	Amazon basin	1942–1945
Alberta conventional oil boom	petroleum	fossil fuel	Alberta, Canada	1947 – 1980
New Zealand wool boom	wool	agricultural	New Zealand	1951 – late 1950s
Bonanza marimbera	cannabis	agricultural	Colombia	1974–1985
Mexican oil boom	petroleum	fossil fuel	Mexico	1977–1981
1970s commodities boom	multiple	multiple	worldwide	1970s
Cocaine era	cocaine	agricultural	Colombia	1985–1994
Merluza boom	fish	hard commodity	Chile	1980s
Chilean salmon boom	fish	soft commodity	Chile	1986–2007
Bolivian gas boom	natural gas	fossil fuel	Bolivia	2001 – 2014
2000s commodities boom	multiple	multiple	worldwide	2000s
Uranium bubble of 2007	uranium	metal	worldwide	2005–2007
North Dakota oil boom	petroleum, shale gas	fossil fuel	North Dakota, US	2006 – c. 2015
Rhodium bubble	rhodium	metal	worldwide (primarily South Africa, Russia)	2008
2020s commodities boom	multiple	multiple	worldwide	2020s
