= 1970s commodities boom =

Rise of many commodity prices in the 70s

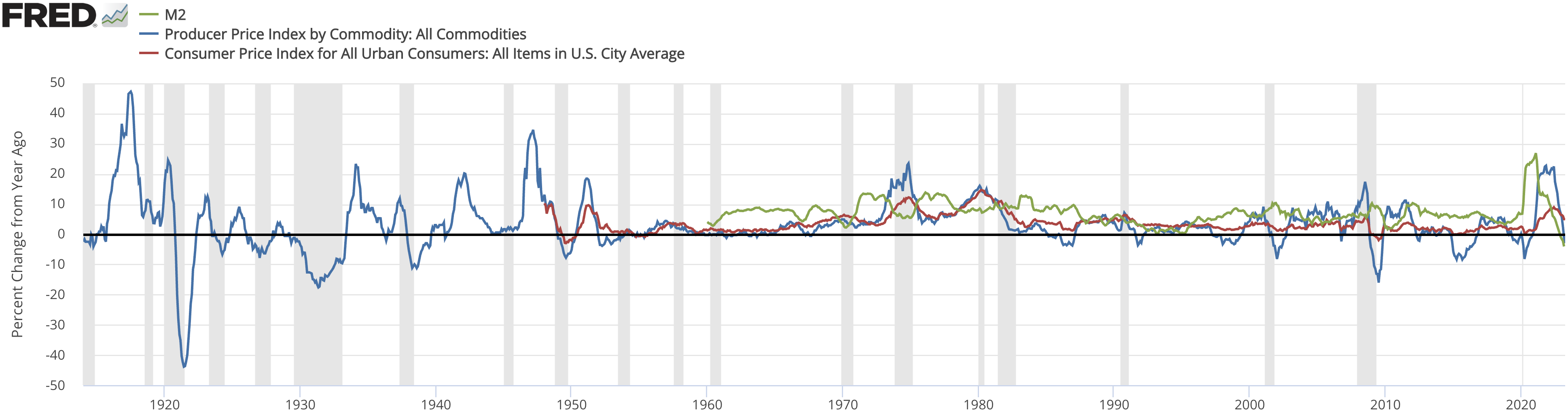
PPI commodities M2 money supply % change year over year Producer price index for commodities United States Consumer Price Index

The 1970s commodities boom refers to the rise of many commodity prices in the 1970s. Excess demand was created with money supply increasing too much and supply shocks that came from Arab–Israeli conflict, initially between Israel and Egypt. The Six-Day War where Israel captured and occupied the Sinai Peninsula for 15 years, the Closure of the Suez Canal (1967–1975) for 8 years of that, led to supply shocks. 66% of oil consumed by Europe at that time came through the Suez Canal and had to be redirected around the continent of Africa. 15% of all maritime trade passed through the Suez Canal in 1966, the year before it closed.

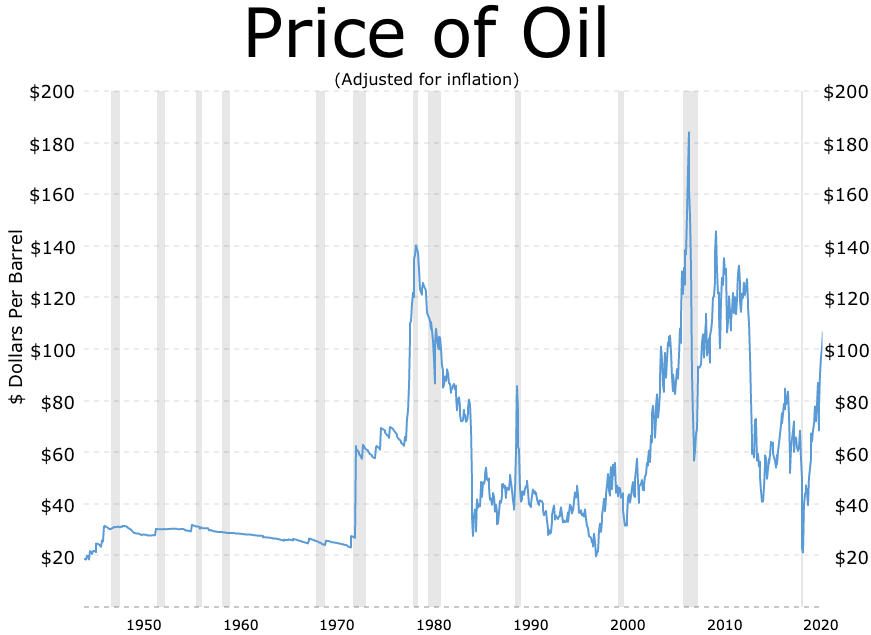
Price of oil adjusted for inflation

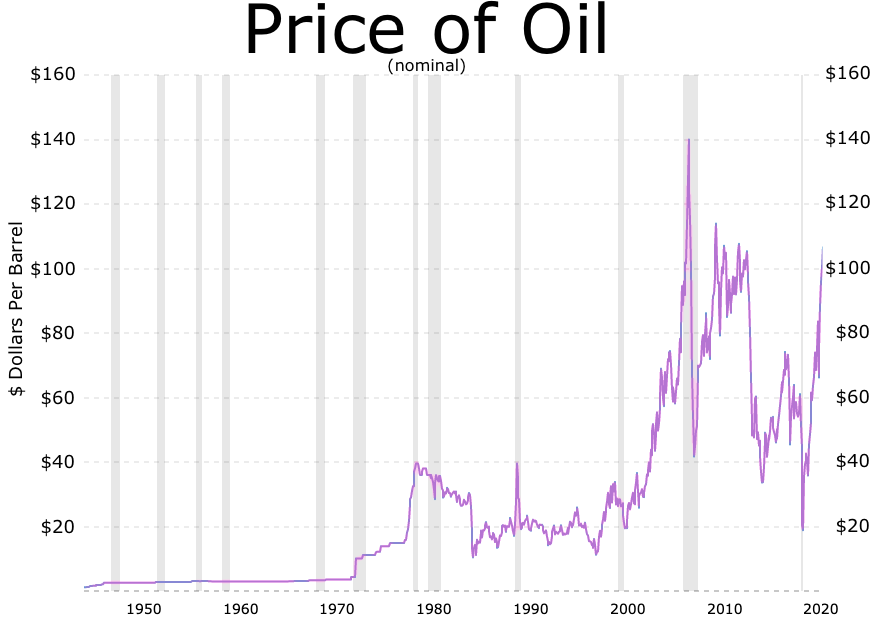
Price of oil (nominal)

West Texas Intermediate oil price history 1946-2022

The Yom Kippur War in late 1973 was Egypts attempt at crossing the Suez Canal and taking the Sinai Peninsula back from Israeli occupation. On October 19, 1973 Richard Nixon requested $2.2 billion to support Israel in the Yom Kippur War. That resulted in OAPEC countries cutting production of oil and placing an embargo on oil exports to the United States and other countries backing Israel. That was the start of the 1973 oil crisis.

== Food commodities ==
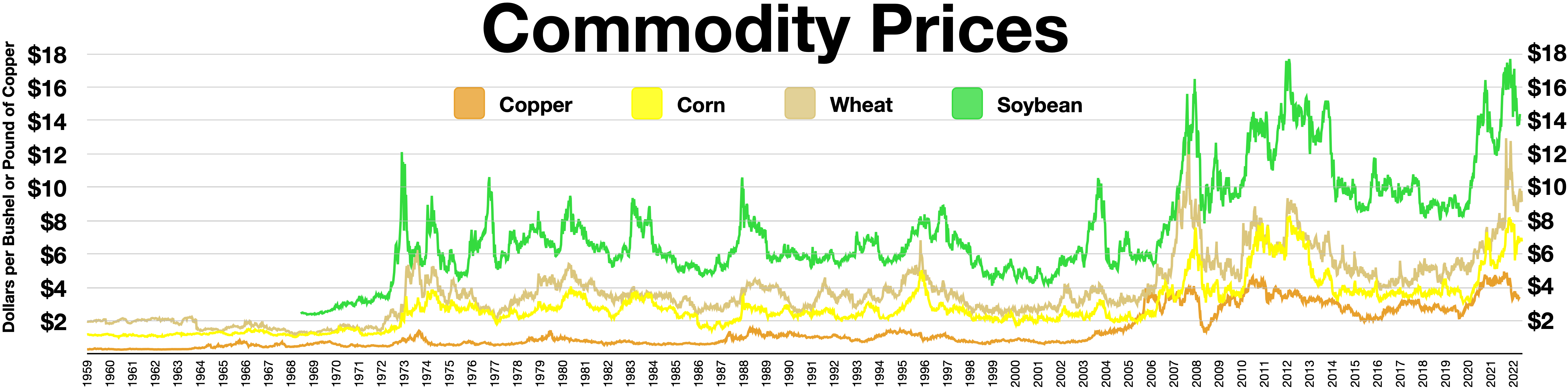
Commodity Prices soybean wheat corn copper

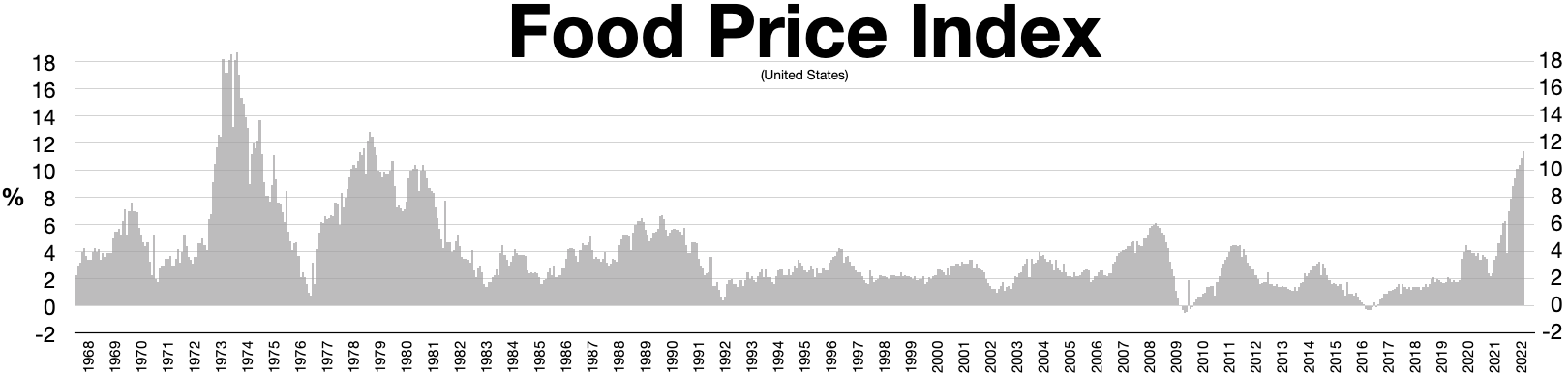
Food Price Index US

In the early 1970s, the Soviet Union and many other planned economies started importing large amounts of grains in the global markets, driving up demand for grains and oilseeds.

=== Sugar ===
Sugar prices spiked in the 1970s because of Soviet Union demand/hoarding and possible futures contracts market manipulation. The Soviet Union was the largest producer of sugar at the time. In 1974, Coca-Cola switched over to high-fructose corn syrup because of the elevated prices.

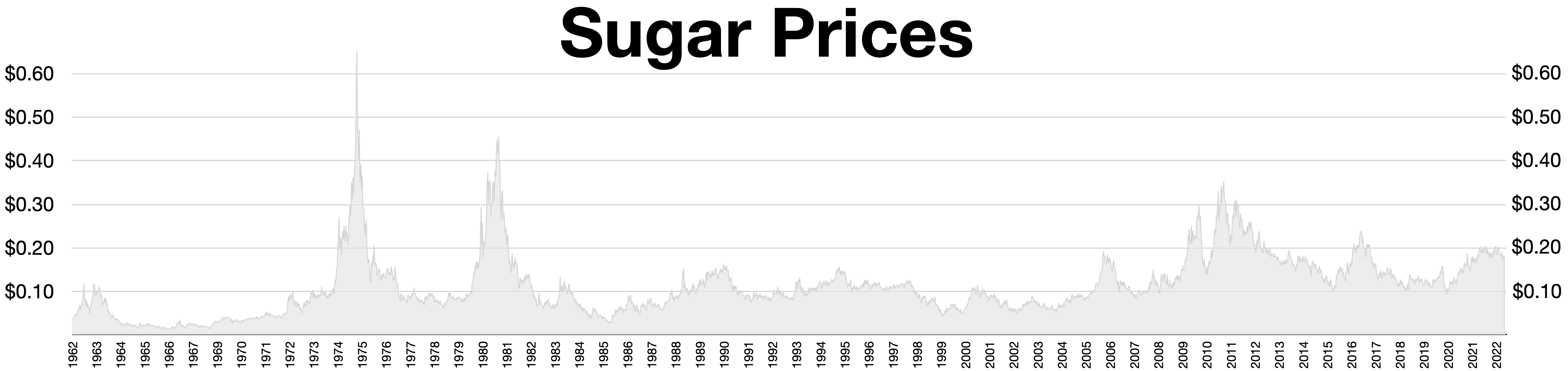
Sugar prices 1962–2022

=== Coffee ===
The price of coffee went up in the mid-1970s because of a black frost of 1975 that killed 66% of Brazil's coffee trees, which was the number one producer of coffee at the time. There was a big earthquake in 1976 in Guatemala that disrupted supply chains, the world's fifth biggest coffee exporter at the time. The Angolan Civil War started in 1975 disrupting their coffee production and shipping.

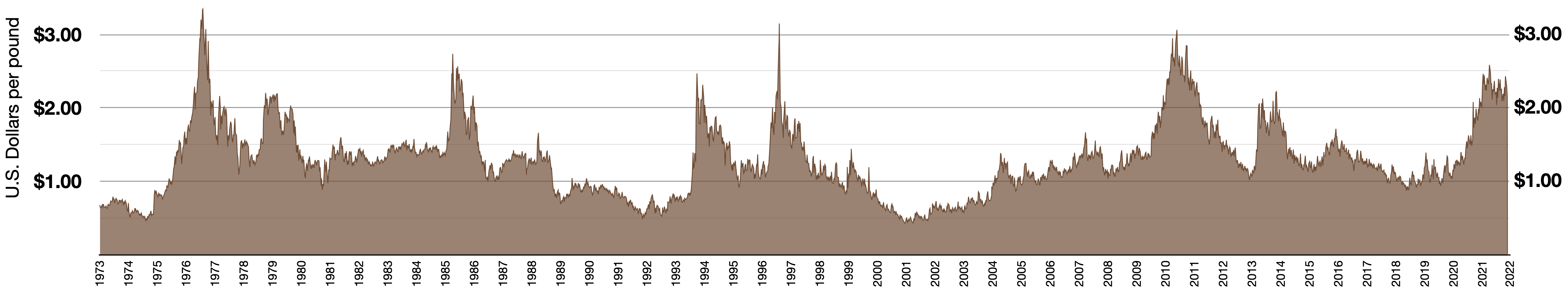
Coffee prices 1973–2022

== Gold ==
The United States weaned itself off the gold standard in the 1970s, allowing the price of gold to float. The price of gold went from a set exchange rate of $42.22 per troy ounce in 1973 to almost $200 per ounce in 1976.

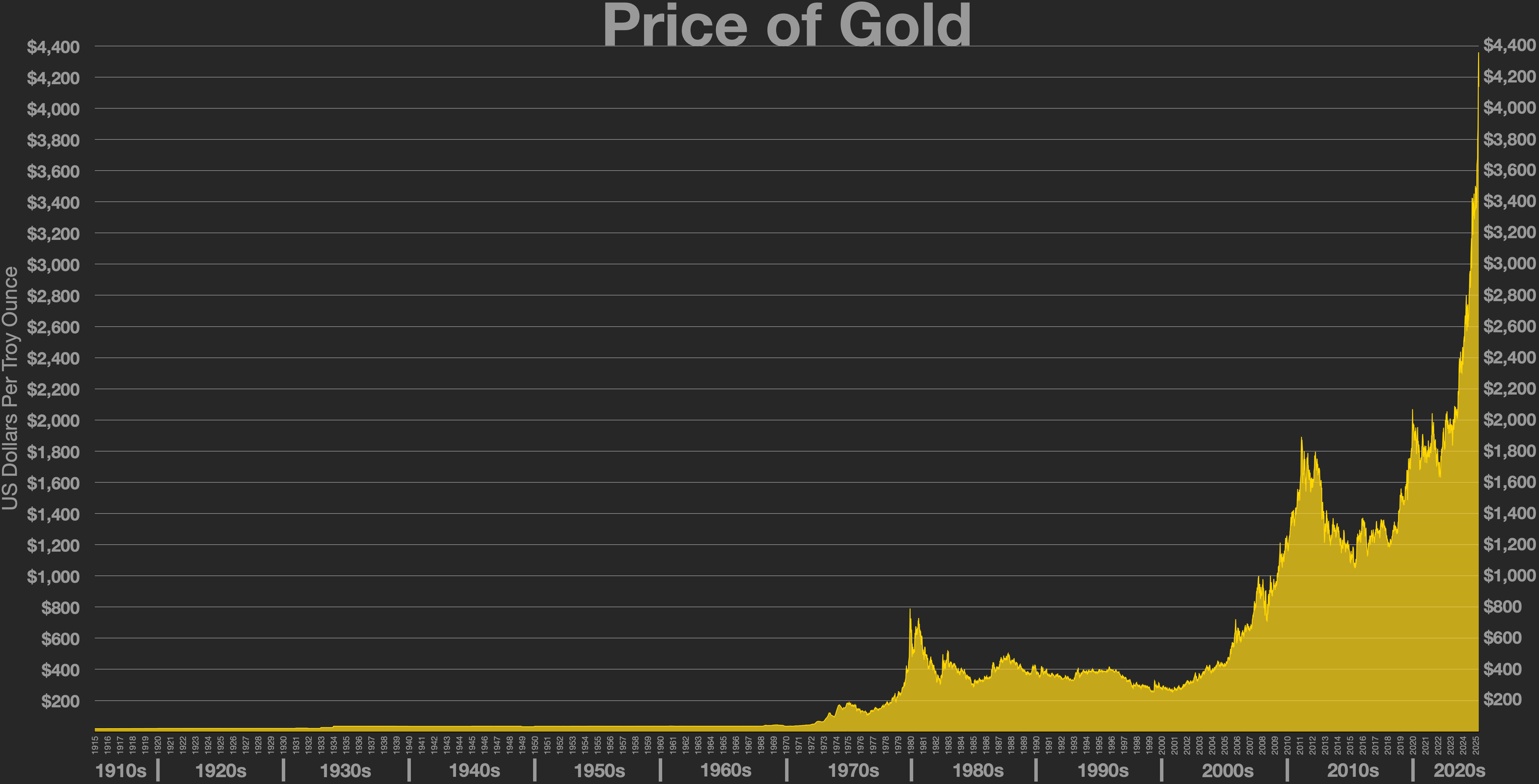
Price of gold 1915-2022

== Copper ==
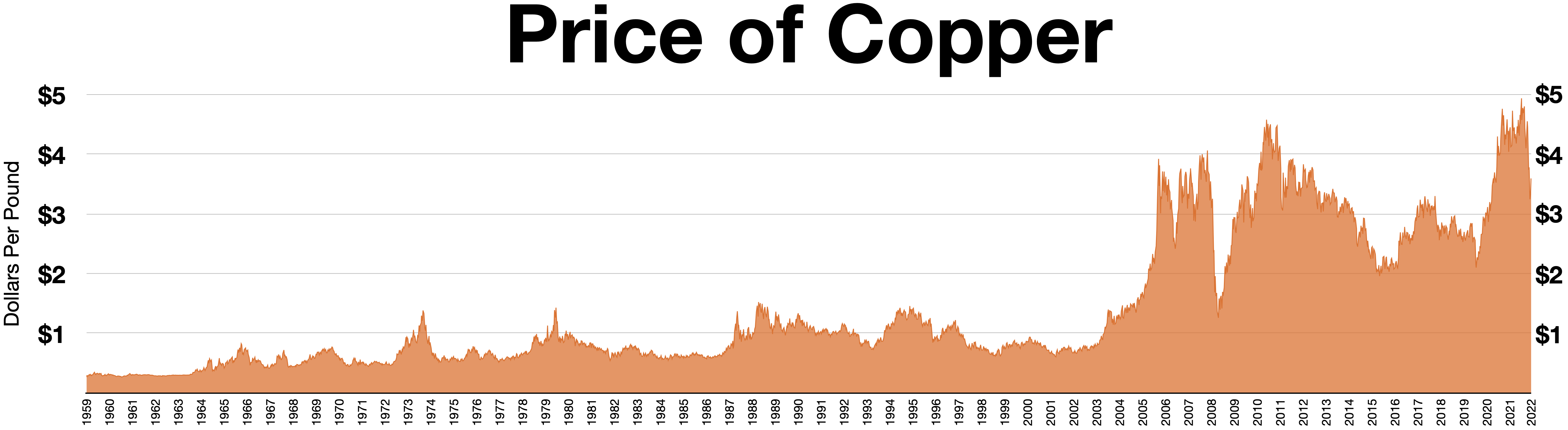
Price of copper

Price controls were implemented in the early 1970s to combat inflation but when those price controls were lifted on commodities like copper the prices appreciated. These quick price rises were known as the Nixon shock.

== Coal ==
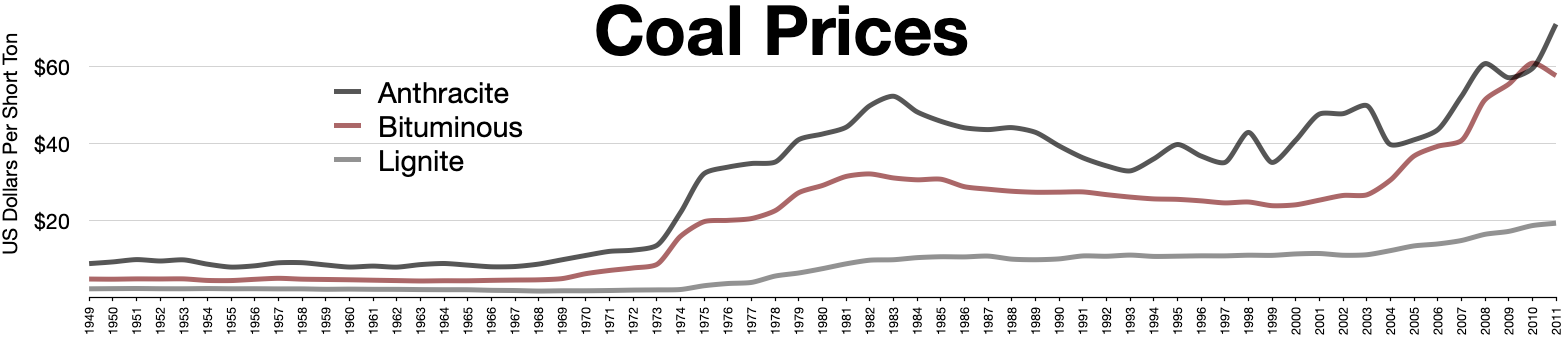
Coal Prices 1949–2011 Anthracite Bituminous Lignite

Coal price increases in the 1970s were primarily demand driven. There was a strike by the United Mine Workers of America called The Brookside Strike in late 1974 that lasted for 3 weeks but was said to have little impact on prices.

== Floating exchange rates and commodities ==
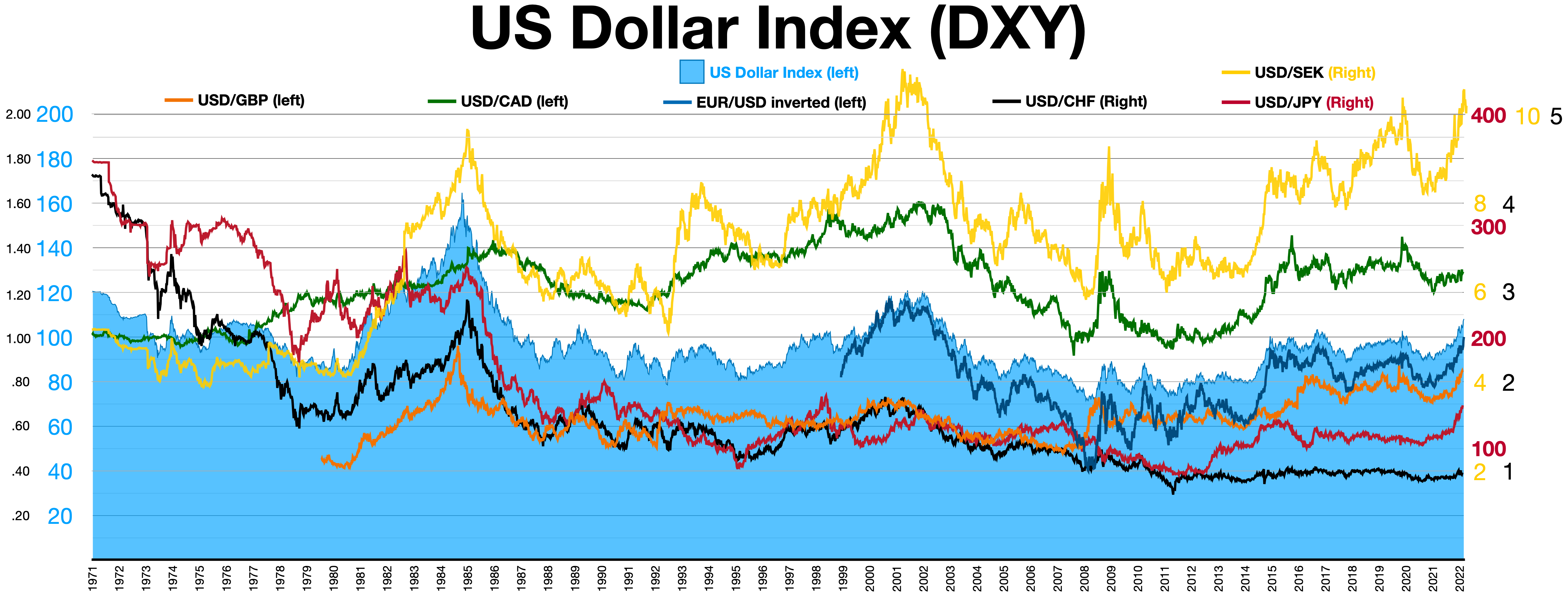
US Dollar Index (DXY) 1971-2022 USD/GBP exchange rate USD/Canadian dollar exchange rate EUR/USD (inverted) exchange rate USD/JPY exchange rate USD/SEK exchange rate USD/CHF exchange rate

After World War II the Bretton Woods system had fixed exchange rates between countries and pegged to gold. This kept some commodities like gold very stable. When the Bretton Woods system failed in the early 1970s and floating exchange rates started to float, commodities also became very volatile.

== See also ==
- 1976 sterling crisis
- 2000s commodities boom
- 2020s commodities boom
- List of commodity booms
- Petrocurrency
- Stagflation
- U.S. Dollar Index
- Winter of Discontent
