= Extractivism =

Process of extracting resources from the earth

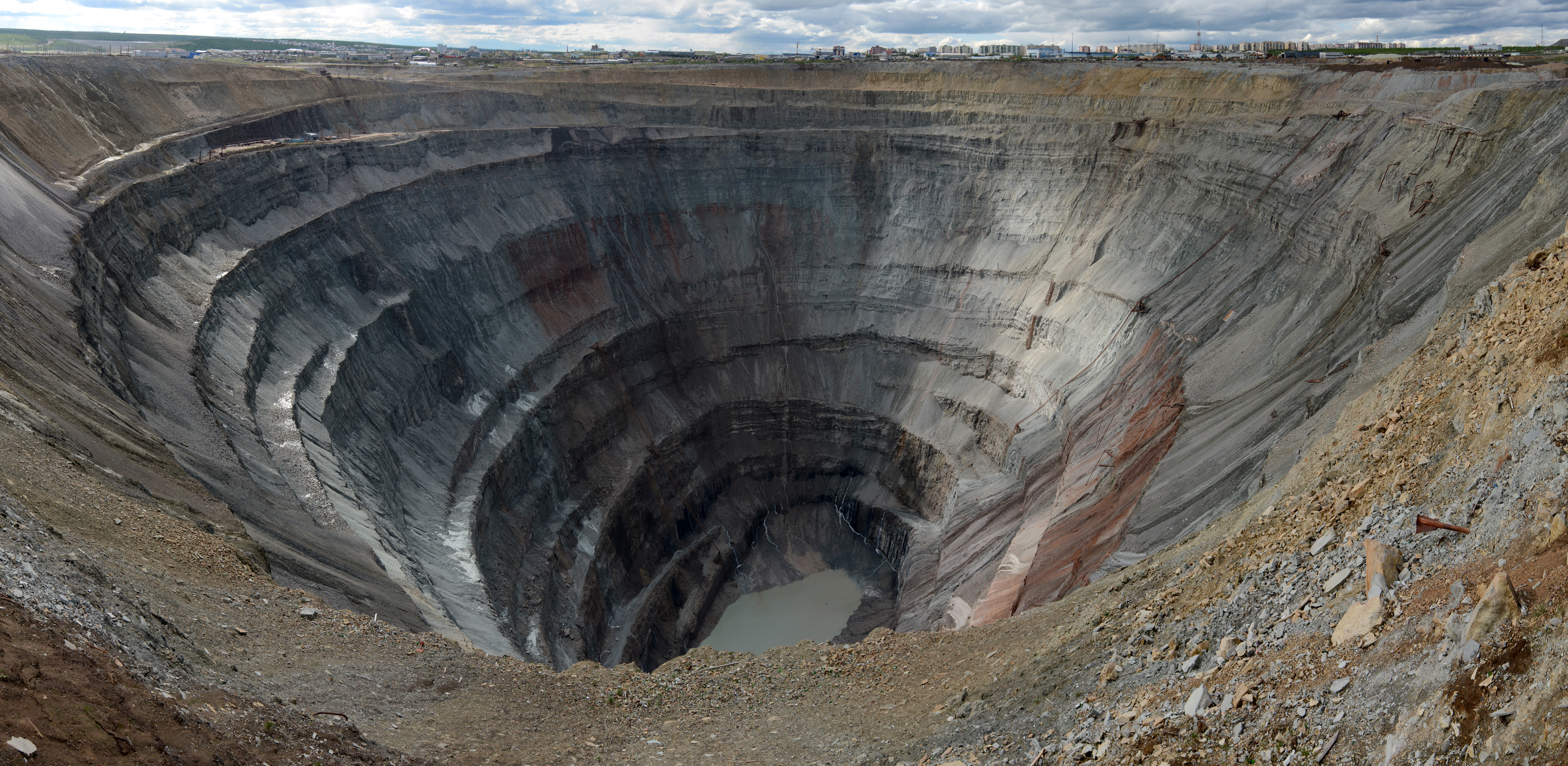
Example of extractivism: open-pit mining in Russia.

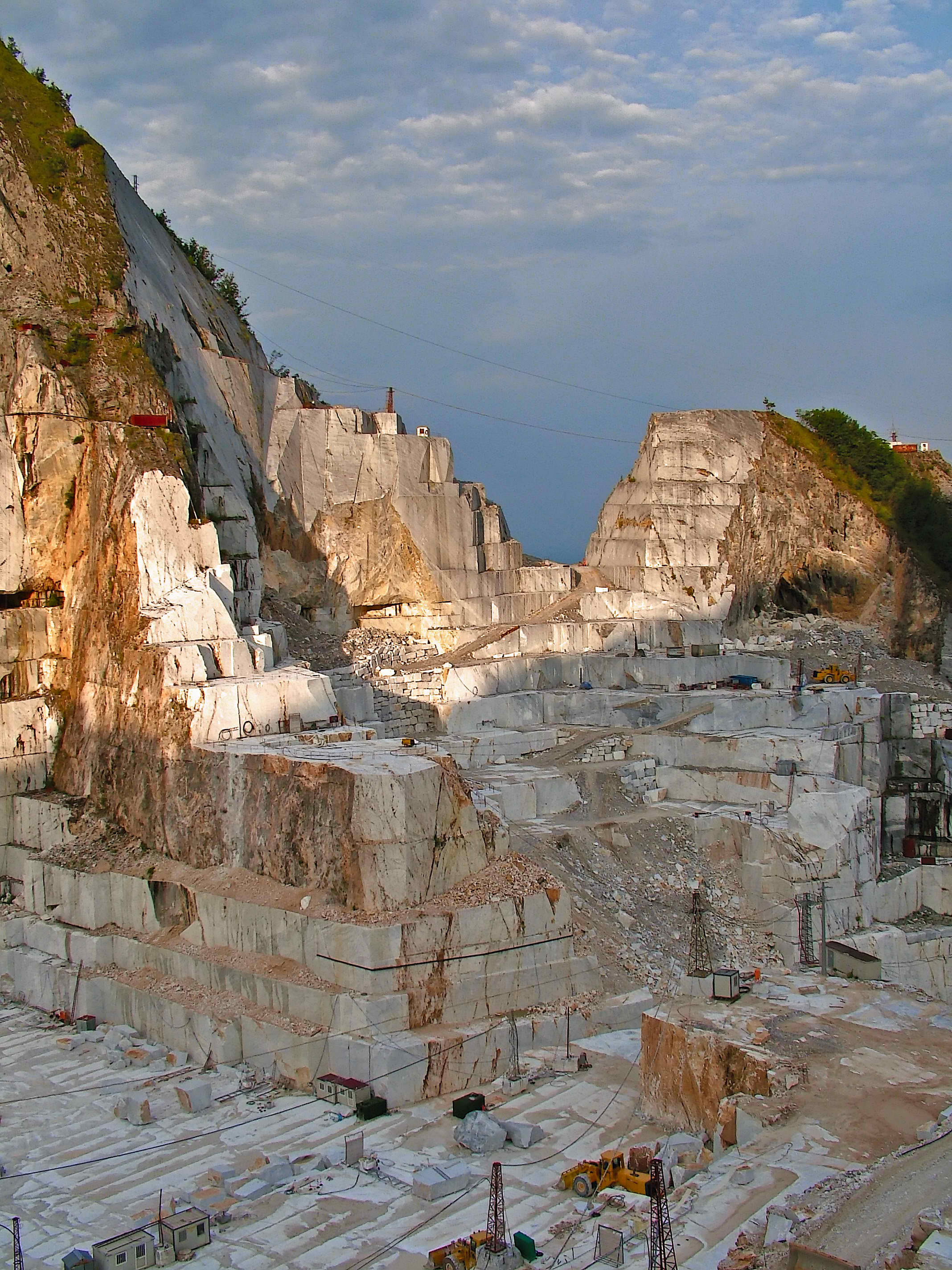
Example of European extractivism: a quarry in the Apuan Alps, Italy. No Cav is an anti-extractivism movement fighting against this activity.

Extractivism is the removal of natural resources, particularly for export, with minimal processing. This economic model is common throughout the Global South and the Arctic region, but also occurs in some sacrifice zones in the Global North, in European extractivism. The concept was coined in Portuguese as "extractivismo" in 1996 to describe the for-profit exploitation of forest resources in Brazil. (Note: Other sources credit Uruguayan social ecologist Eduardo Gudynas for coining the concept in 2009.)

Many actors are involved in the process of extractivism. These mainly include transnational corporations (TNCs) as the main players, but also include the government and some (chiefly economic) community members. Trends have demonstrated that countries do not often extract their own resources; extraction is often led from abroad. Extractivism is controversial because it exists at the intersection where economic growth and environmental protection meet. This intersection is known as the green economy. Extractivism has evolved in the wake of neo-liberal economic transitions, becoming a potential avenue for development. This development occurs through stabilizing growth rates and increasing direct foreign investment.

However, while these short-term economic benefits can be substantial, extractivism as a development model is often critiqued for failing to deliver the improved living conditions it promises and to work collaboratively with already existing programs, therefore inflicting environmental, social and political consequences. (Note: According to economists Andrea Cori and Salvatore Monni extractivism perpetuates a resource curse, a phenomenon that causes countries rich in natural resources to have slow economic growth, low development, corrupt governments and unequal distribution of wealth, since the wealth produced with the resource is exported to other countries or oligopolic companies, which use a part of the wealth generated to bribe local governments to increase extractivism, creating a positive feedback for unequal wealth distribution.)

Environmental concerns of extractivism include: climate change, soil depletion, deforestation, a severe loss of food sovereignty, declining biodiversity, and contamination of freshwater. Social and political implications include violation of human rights, unsafe labor conditions, unequal wealth distribution, and conflict. As a result, extractivism remains a prominent debate in policy-related discourse because, while it sometimes delivers high economic gains in the short term, it also poses social and environmental dangers. Case studies in Latin America demonstrate these policy gaps.

== Background ==
=== Definition ===
Extractivism is the removal of large quantities of raw or natural materials, particularly for export, with minimal processing. The concept emerged in the 1990s (as extractivismo) to describe resource appropriation for export in Latin America. Scholarly work on extractivism has since applied the concept to other geographical areas and also to more abstract forms of extraction such as the digital and intellectual realms or finance. Regardless of its range of application, the concept of extractivism may be essentially conceived as "a particular way of thinking and the properties and practices organized toward the goal of maximizing benefit through extraction, which brings in its wake violence and destruction". Guido Pascual Galafassi and Lorena Natalia Riffo see the concept as a continuation of Galeano's Open Veins of Latin America (1971).

==== Criticism ====
The term, with its negative connotations has drawn comments from some economists and high-ranking officials in South America. Álvaro García Linera, Vice President of Bolivia from 2005 to 2019, wrote:

All societies and modes of production have these different levels of processing of "raw materials" in their own way. If we conceptualize "extractivism" as the activity that only extracts raw materials (renewable or non-renewable), without introducing further transformation in labor activity, then all societies in the world, capitalist and non-capitalist, are also extractivist to a greater or lesser extent. The agrarian non-capitalist societies that processed iron, copper, gold or bronze on a greater or lesser scale, had some type of specialized extractive activity, complemented in some cases with the simple or complex processing of that raw material. Even the societies that lived or live from the extraction of wood and chestnut along with hunting and fishing, maintain a type of extractive activity of renewable natural resources.

The concept of extractivism has been criticized by Nicolás Eyzaguirre, Chilean Minister of Finance between 2000 and 2006, who cites the mining sector of Australia as a successful example of a "deep and sophisticated value chain", with high human capital, self-produced machinery and associated top-tier scientific research. In the case of Chile, Eyzaguirre argues that rentierism, rather than extractivism, should be the concept of concern.

=== History ===
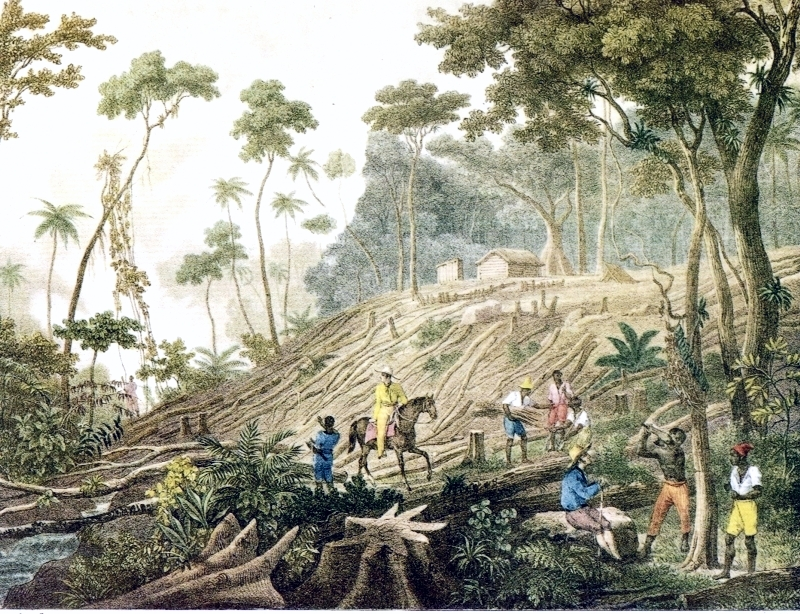
Slaves clearing the Atlantic Forest in Brazil, c. 1820–1825, by Moritz Rugendas.

Extractivism has been occurring for over 500 years. During colonization, large quantities of natural resources were exported from colonies in Africa, Asia, and the Americas to meet the demands of metropolitan centers.

According to Rafael Domínguez, the Chilean government coalition Concertación, which ruled Chile from 1990 to 2010, pioneered "neo-extractivism".

=== Philosophy ===
Extractivism is a result of colonial thought, which places humans above other life forms. It is rooted in the belief that taking from the earth will create abundance. Many Indigenous scholars argue that extractivism runs counter to their philosophy of living in balance with the earth and other life forms to create abundance. Leanne Betasamosake Simpson, a Michi Saagiig Nishnaabeg scholar and writer, compares these ideas of destruction versus regeneration in her book A Short History of the Blockade. She references the Trent–Severn Waterway, a dam in Canada that caused major loss of fish, a major source of food for her people. She quotes Freda Huson in saying, "Our people's belief is that we are part of the land. The land is not separate from us. The land sustains us. And if we don't take care of her, she won't be able to sustain us, and we as a generation of people will die." She also defines extractivism in another work, stating it is "stealing. It's taking something, whether it's a process, an object, a gift, or a person, out of the relationships that give it meaning, and placing it in a nonrelational context for the purposes of accumulation. The colonial action of theft goes beyond only extracting from the earth. This philosophy of entitlement is the cause behind colonization itself, and we are watching the continuation of theft in real-time through practices such as extractivism". Naomi Klein also touches on this in her book This Changes Everything: Capitalism vs. The Climate. She writes, "Extractivism ran rampant under colonialism because relating to the world as a frontier of conquest- rather than a home- fosters this particular brand of irresponsibility. The colonial mind nurtures the belief that there is always somewhere else to go to and exploit once the current site of extraction has been exhausted."

=== Actors ===
Transnational corporations (TNCs) are primary actors in neo-extractivism. Originally, as TNCs began exploring raw material extraction in developing countries, they were applauded for taking the risk of extracting high-demand resources. TNCs were able to navigate their way into a position where they maintained large amounts of control over various extraction-based industries. This success is attributed to the often weak governance structures of resource-dependent economies where extraction is taking place. Through complex arrangements and agreements, resources have slowly become denationalized. As a result of this, the government has taken a "hands-off" approach, awarding most of the control over resource enclaves and the social responsibility that accompanies them to TNCs. However, the government still plays an important role in leading development by determining which TNCs they allow to extract their resources and how thorough they are when it comes to enforcing certain standards of social responsibility.

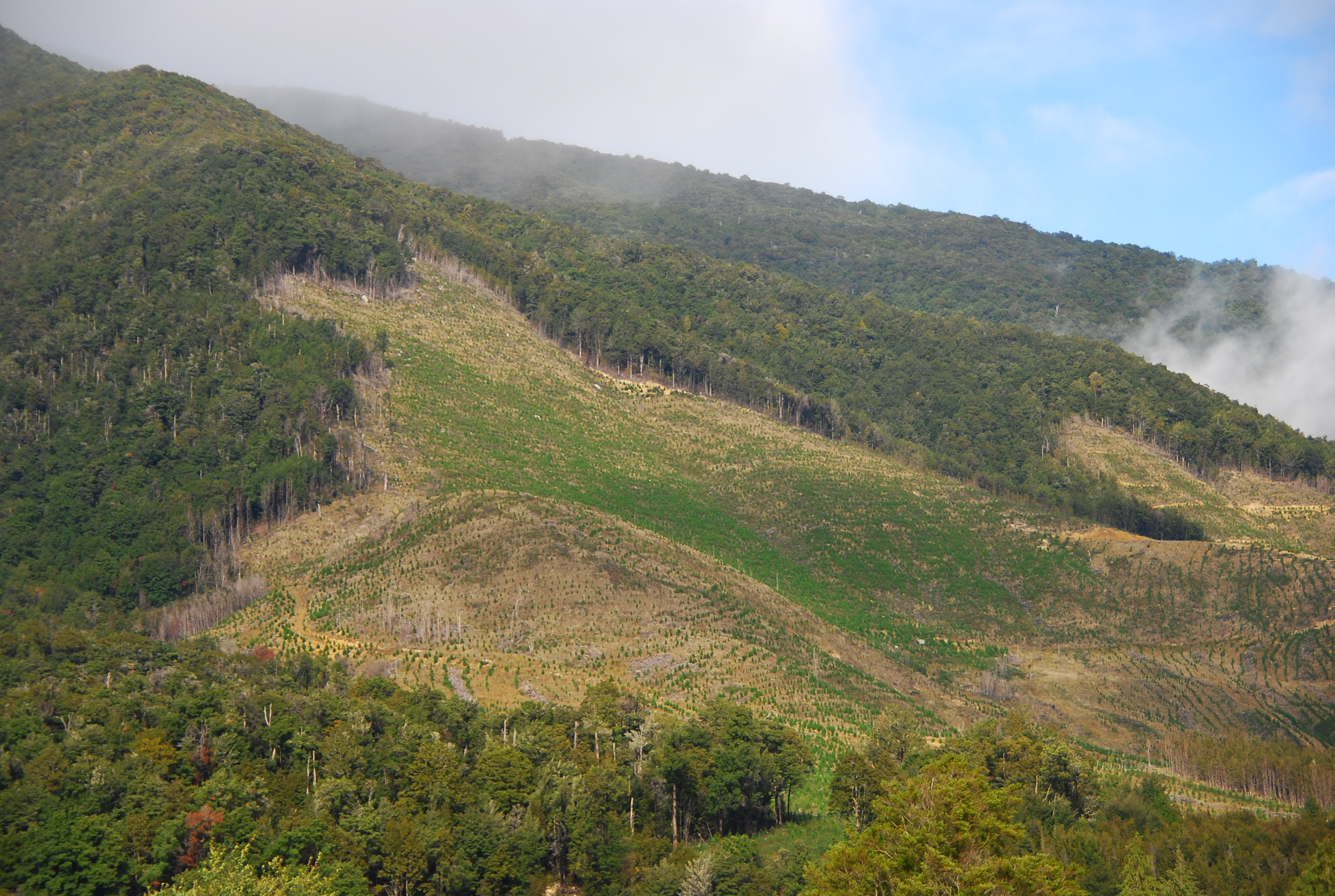
Example of mass extraction of trees for lumber, resulting in deforestation.

=== Resources and techniques ===
Some resources that are obtained through extraction include, but are not limited to, gold, diamonds, oil, lumber, water, and food. This occurs through techniques such as mining, drilling and deforestation. Resources are typically extracted from developing countries as a raw material. This means that it has not been processed or has been processed only slightly. These materials then travel elsewhere to be turned into goods that are for sale on the world market. An example of this would be gold that is mined as a raw mineral and later in the supply chain is manufactured into jewelry.

== Neo-Extractivism ==
=== Definition ===
Neo-extractivism, which was adopted primarily by countries in Latin America during the commodity boom of the early 2000s, refers to a development model where state governments increase their control over the extraction and revenue of natural resources to fund social programs. Unlike other neoliberal extractivist models, neo-extractivism regulates the allotment of resources and their revenue, pushes state-ownership of companies and exports, revises contracts, and raises export duties and taxes while still remaining an export driven economy reliant on global markets. Neo-extractivist models are most commonly connected with the 'Pink Tide' governments of the 21st century. Pink Tide governments claimed that intense extractivism was necessary to fund social programs such as poverty reduction, expansion of infrastructure, and social inclusion. Neo-extractivism has similarities to older forms of extractivism and exists in the realm of neo-colonialism.

=== Redistribution Efforts ===
Governments employing neo-extractivism would often justify the continued use of extractivism by arguing that revenues from exported resources would finance social programs such as poverty reduction and infrastructure investment. During the early 2000s commodity boom and the rise of neo-extractivist governments in Latin America, the large increase in exports and therefore revenues saw an increased investment in social programs. This increase in social funding led to measurable improvement in poverty and other indicators of poverty across Latin America.

=== Critique ===
Although measurable statistics are showing social improvement under neo-extractivist governments, many critics argue that the continued reliance on commodity exports encourages a singular economy, putting the country at greater risk. Critics argue that rooting social programs in international commodity markets makes them increasingly vulnerable to global market changes and sudden drops in exports. The sudden drops in social funding can destabilize not just the economy, but the social programs rooted in it as well. On top of that, critics argue that neo-extractivist governments also increase the power of governmental executives, leading to less consultation and options for participation from the public.

Scholars also note the socio-ecological issues arising from the expansion of extraction under neo-extractivist governments. Some of the main issues critics mention are community displacement, ecological degradation, state militarization of extractive zones, and increasingly violent land disputes in rural and indigenous communities. During the same commodity boom that improved social conditions, factors such as biodiversity loss, forest clearing, pollution in water supplies, and health risks surrounding toxic waste deposits all worsened. Scholars and indigenous communities also critique the use of progressive language and the framing of neo-extractivist policies as positive, while reinforcing the reliance on commodity exports and intensifying ecological damage.

=== Neo-extractivism in Ecuador ===
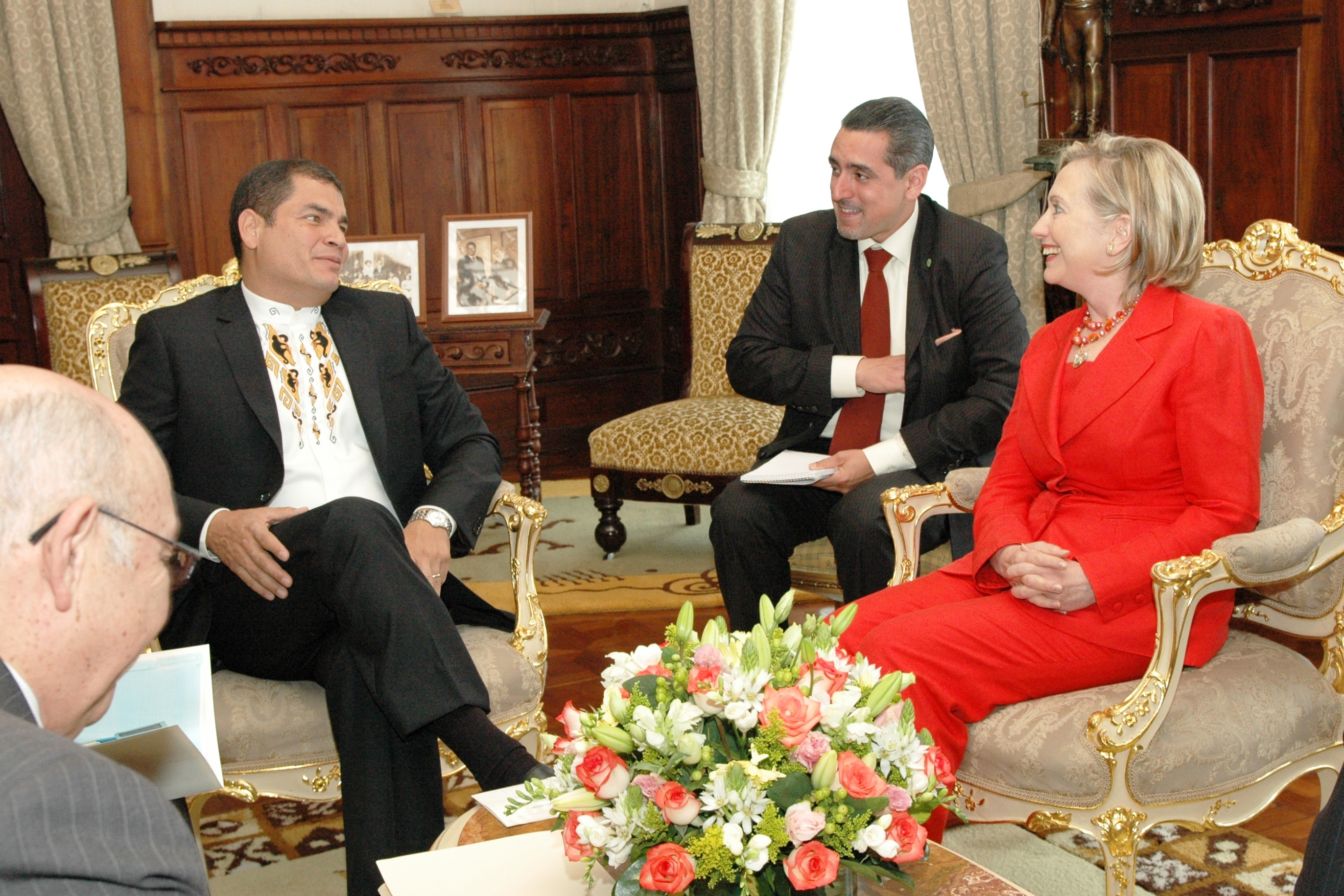
President Correa (Left) speaks with Secretary Clinton (Right) in Ecuador.

During the Correa government from 2007 - 2016, Ecuador was run under a deeply neo-extractivist development model. Oil drilling and mining increased under the government, and the state had much more control over the revenue from the exports. Correa ran on the idea of expanding social funding through extractivist revenue, justifying it as a developmental strategy that could bring Ecuador beyond a reliance on extractivism.

Revenue from oil exports was used to invest in rural roads, hospitals, schools, housing, water and sanitation, electricity, and cash transfer programs for citizens. Under Correa's government, data showed that poverty fell by 37%, and extreme poverty by 49%. Social spending per GDP in Ecuador increased 3% during the neo-extractivist government. The revenue helped to increase equality, with the Gini Index dropping 0.087 points over 10 years (2007 - 2017).

Data also show increased reliance on exports during the Correa government, with 80.8% of exports in 2013 coming from the oil industry. Although there were attempts to diversify their economy, they were constrained by the global markets and ended up more reliant on commodity exports. In the 2008 constitution, the Correa government centered the rights of nature, Buen Vivir language, and indigenous rights in their values. However, this kind of language was conflicting with the Correa government's increasing dependence on extraction. While the neo-extractivist developmental model did show measurable improvements in social conditions, it also revealed the structural boundaries of an export-driven extractivist economy and the socioecological conflicts that follow.

== Impacts of Extractivism ==
=== Economic benefits ===
Demand for extracted resources on the global market has allowed this industry to expand. Since the year 2000, there has been a substantial rise in global demand and value for raw materials – this has contributed to steadily high prices. Extractivism has therefore been seen as a tool for economically advancing developing countries that are rich in natural resources by participating in this market.

It is argued that the emergence of this industry in the neo-liberal context has enabled extractivism to stabilize growth rates, increase direct foreign investment, diversify local economies, expand the middle class, and reduce poverty. This is done by using surplus revenue to invest in development projects such as expanding social programs and infrastructure. Overall, extraction-based economies are seen as long-term development projects that guarantee a robust economic foundation. It has created a new hegemonic order that closely intertwines with the dominant capitalist system of the world. The green economy has emerged as an economic model in response to the arising tensions between the economy and the environment. Extractivism is one of the many issues that exist at this intersection between the economy and the environment.

Increasingly, policy tools such as corporate social responsibility mechanisms and increased government involvement are being used to mitigate the negative implications of extractivism and make it a more effective development model.

=== Environmental consequences ===
One of the main consequences of extractivism is the toll that it takes on the natural environment. Due to the scale of extraction, several renewable resources are becoming non-renewable. This means that the environment is incapable of renewing its resources as quickly as the rate at which they are extracted. It is often falsely assumed that technological advancements will enable resources to renew more effectively and, as a result, make raw material extraction more sustainable. The environment often must compensate for overproduction driven by high demand. Global climate change, soil depletion, loss of biodiversity and contamination of fresh water are some of the environmental issues that extractivism contributes to. As well, extraction produces large amounts of waste such as toxic chemicals and heavy metals that are difficult to dispose of properly. To what degree humans have a right to take from the environment for developmental purposes is a topic that continues to be debated.

=== Social impacts ===
In addition to the environmental consequences of extractivism, social impacts arise. Local communities are often opposed to extractivism. This is because it often uproots the communities or causes environmental impacts that will affect their quality of life. Indigenous communities tend to be particularly susceptible to the social impacts of extractivism. Indigenous peoples rely on their environment to sustain their lifestyles and to connect with the land in spiritual ways. Extractivist policies and practices heavily destroy the land as explained above. This changes game populations and animal migration patterns, pollutes rivers, and much more. Doing so does not allow Indigenous populations to practice their culture and ways of life because the environment they depend on to hunt, fish, etc., is drastically changed. In addition, this destruction hinders the practice of Indigenous culture and the creation of knowledge, making it more difficult for Indigenous individuals to pass down their traditions to future generations.

While employment opportunities are brought to local communities as a pillar of neo-extractivism projects, the conditions are often unsafe for workers. TNCs can take advantage of more lenient health and safety conditions in developing countries and pay inadequate wages to maximize their profits. As well, foreigners usually fill the highest paying managerial positions, leaving local community members to do the most labour-intensive jobs. Frequently, the enclaves where extractivism occurs are distanced from government involvement, therefore allowing them to avoid being subjected to the enforcement of national laws to protect citizens. This can result in widespread human rights violations. It is argued that prolonged social transformation cannot thrive on export dependent extractivism alone therefore making neo-extractivism a potentially flawed development method on its own.

=== Political implications ===
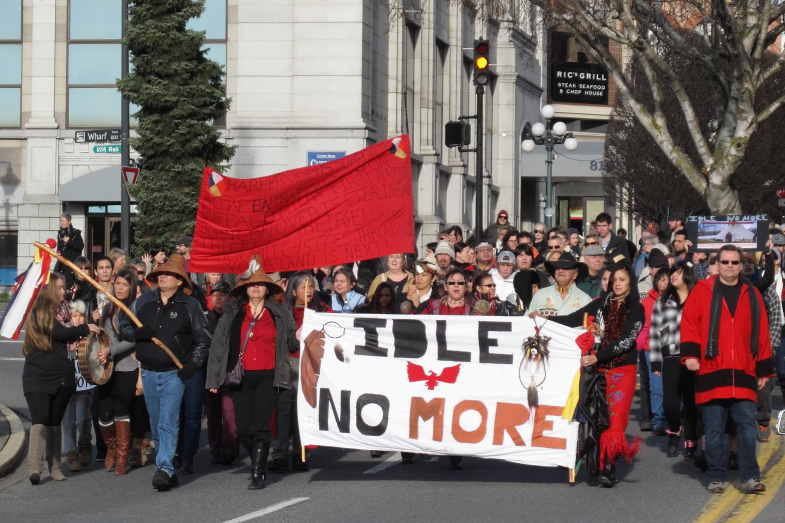
The Idle No More campaign began in Canada to build indigenous sovereignty and nationhood and to protect water, air, land, and all creation for future generations.

Because the state is a prominent actor in the extractivist process, this has several political implications. It pushes the state into a position where they are one of the central actors involved in development when recent decades have seen a shift to civil society organizations. As well, the relationship between the State providing the natural resources and the TNCs extracting them can be politically complex, sometimes leading to corruption. Likewise, as a result of government involvement, this process as a development project becomes politicized. The increasing demand for raw materials also increases the likelihood of conflict breaking out over natural resources.

Extractivism near or on Indigenous land without the permission of Indigenous peoples begins to threaten the land-based self-determination of Indigenous groups. Conflicts between Indigenous peoples, corporations, and governments are occurring around the world. Because many of the extractivist practices take place where Indigenous communities are located, the conflicts are making these landscapes politicized and contested. The conflicts are driven because Indigenous lives are put in jeopardy when they are dispossessed, when they lose their livelihoods, when their water and land is polluted and the environment is commodified.

=== Anti-extractivist activism ===
Because extractivism so often has negative implications for the Indigenous communities it affects, there is much resistance and activism on their part. For example, from the 1980s and through today, we can see examples of "extrACTIVISM", a term coined by author Anna J. Willow. In protest of the logging project on their land, the Penan of Borneo, Malaysia claimed it was a case of civil disobedience as a means to end it, and succeeded. In '89, Kayapó peoples stood up against the construction of dams on their land in Pará, Brazil, leading to the project's funding being cut and its successful end. The U'wa people of Colombia ended oil extraction on their land through blockade activism from the 90s through 2000. Just this year, the Keystone Pipeline that runs through Canada and the U.S. was halted due to Indigenous activism. Its construction officially ended in June 2021. Despite the difficulties they face in protesting these projects, their resilience continues to flourish, and oftentimes they succeed in ending extractivism on their land. Another example of this activism is the Ponca tribe planting corn in the path of the Keystone Pipeline as an act of resistance. Aside from active protesting, Tribal sovereignty is essential in their goal of protecting their own land.

== Case studies ==
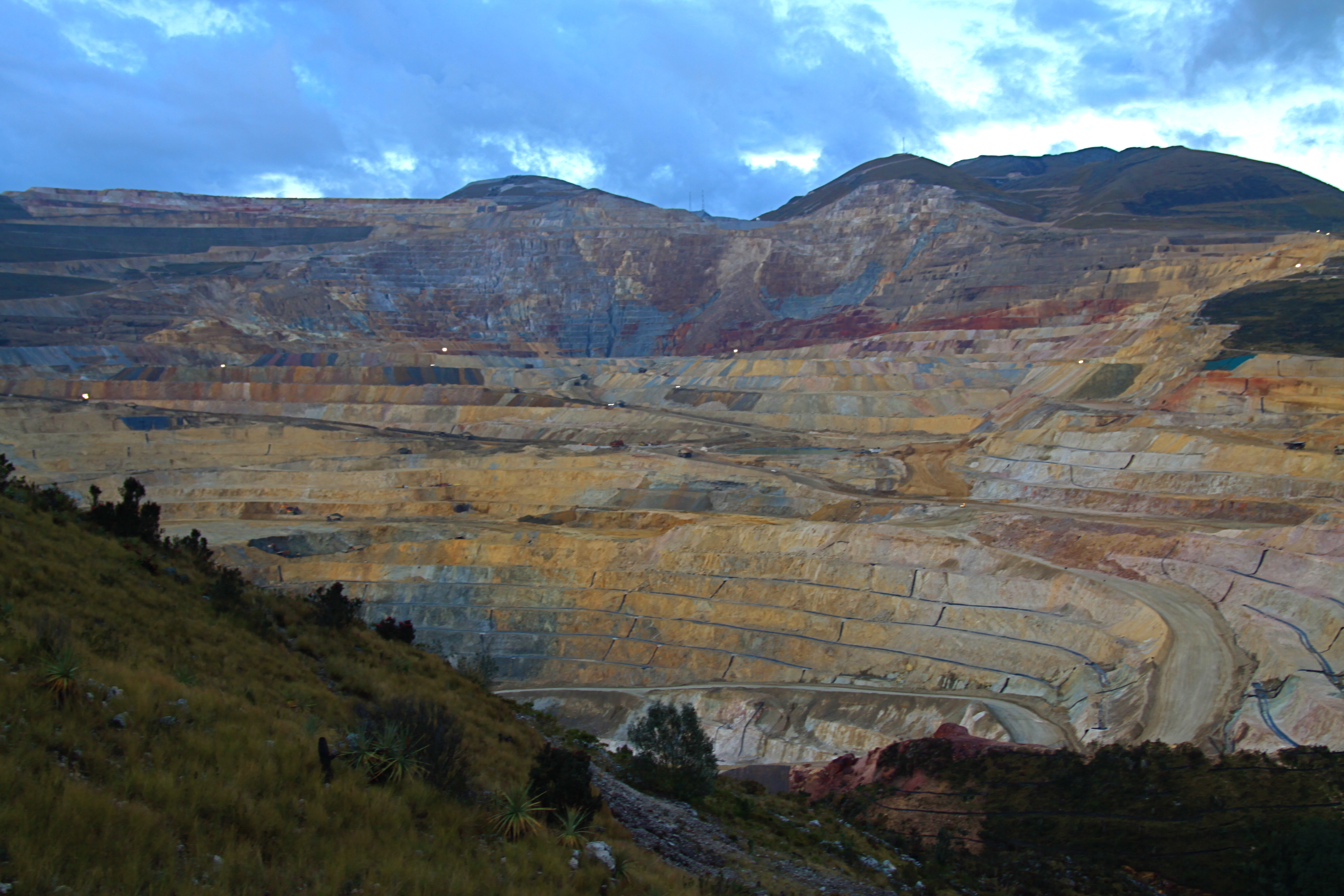
Yanacocha Mine in Cajamarca, Peru.

=== Yanacocha gold mine ===
The Yanacocha gold mine in Cajamarca, Peru, is an extractivist project. In 1993, a joint venture between Newmont Corp and Compañia de Minas Buenaventura began the project. The government favored this project and saw it as an opportunity for development, therefore giving large amounts of control to the mining companies. Local communities expressed concerns about water contamination. The corporations promised the creation of 7,000 jobs and development projects that would be beneficial for the community. The TNC said they would abandon the project if they could not do so on socially and economically responsible terms. However, this guarantee failed to be actualized, and violent conflict broke out as a result of chemical spills and environmental degradation. Regional and national governments had opposing opinions on the project, and protests broke out, injuring more than 20 people and killing five. The regional government sided with the community protestors, rejecting the Cajamarca mining project, but in the end, the national government overrode the concerns of the community and pushed the mine forward, leaving the task of social responsibility to the corporations.

=== Ecuador: oil exploitation in Yasuni National Park ===
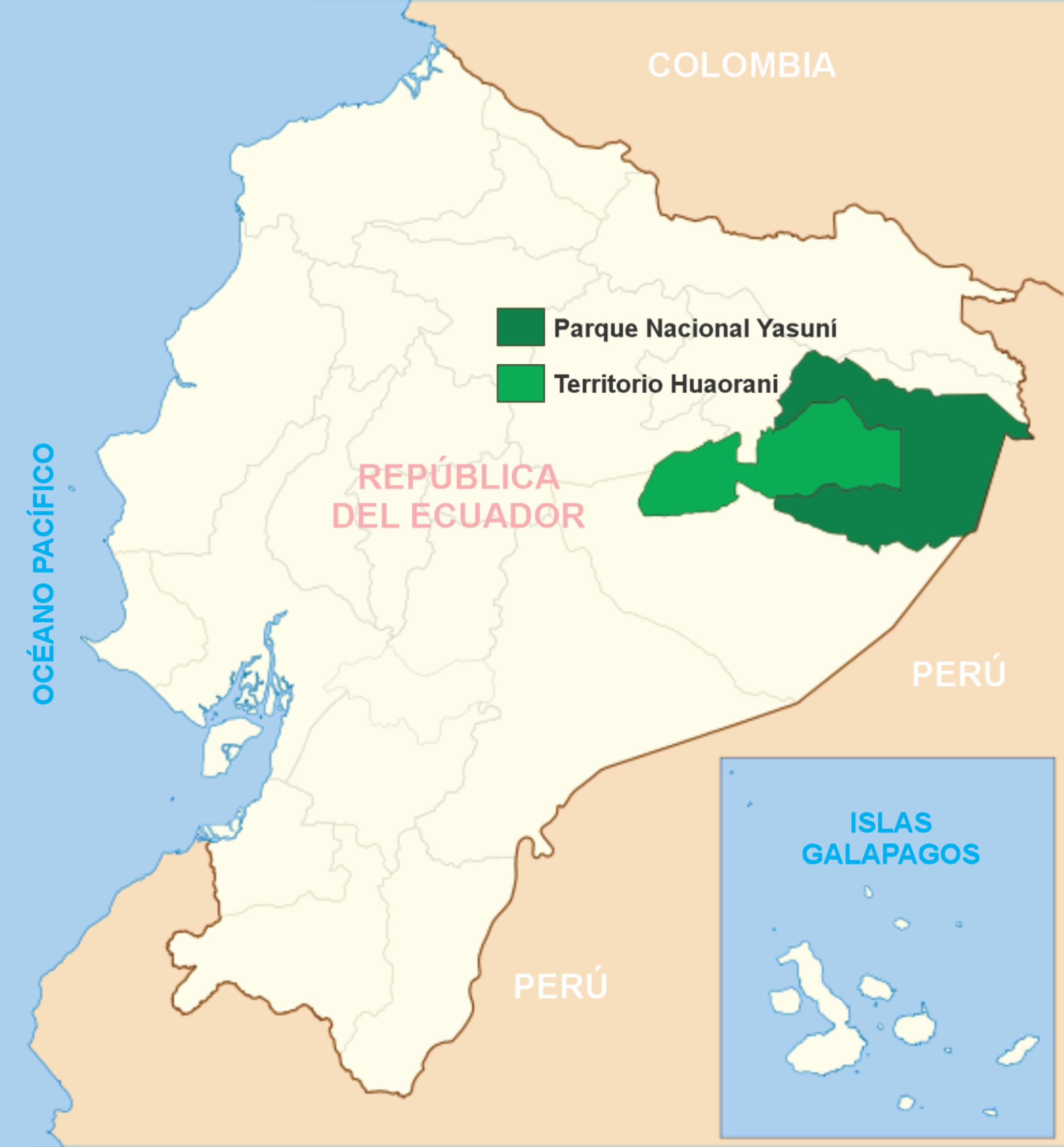
Map of Yasuni National Park in Ecuador (green area).

Many Amazonian communities in Ecuador are opposed to the national government's endorsement of oil extraction in Yasuni National Park. The Spanish corporation Repsol S.A. and American corporation Chevron-Texaco have both attempted to extract oil from the reserves in Yasuni. Various civil society organizations fought against the implementation of this project because of the park's valuable biodiversity. In 2007 under President Correa, Ecuador launched the Yasuní-ITT Initiative, which proposed that the international community would compensate Ecuador $3.5 billion for the lost income that an oil reserve would have generated in exchange for protecting the forest. The initiative only raised $13 million and was canceled in 2013. Drilling began in 2016, and by 2023 several oil platforms had been developed with over 100 oil wells in production.

== See also ==
- Agroextractivism
- Dispossession of land
- Eutrophication
- Exploitation of natural resources
- Indigenous land rights
- Power politics
- Slavery
- Toxic colonialism
- No Cav

== Bibliography ==
- Acosta, Alberto. "Extractivism and neo-extractivism: two sides of the same curse."Beyond Development: Alternative Visions From Latin America, (2013): 61–87.
- Burchardt, H.; Dietz, K. (2014). "(Neo)-extractivism – a new challenge for development theory from Latin America". Third World Quarterly. 24 (3): 468–86. doi:10.1080/01436597.2014.893488. S2CID 153475041.
- Chagnon, Christopher W.; Durante, Francesco; Gills, Barry K.; Hagolani-Albov, Sophia E.; Hokkanen, Saana; Kangasluoma, Sohvi M. J.; Konttinen, Heidi; Kröger, Markus; LaFleur, William; Ollinaho, Ossi; Vuola, Marketta P. S. (2022-05-09). "From extractivism to global extractivism: the evolution of an organizing concept". The Journal of Peasant Studies. 49 (4). Informa UK Limited: 760–792. doi:10.1080/03066150.2022.2069015. hdl:10138/346700. ISSN 0306-6150. S2CID 248714959.
- Durante, Francesco; Kröger, Markus; LaFleur, William (2021-05-30). "Extraction and Extractivisms". Our Extractive Age. London: Routledge. pp. 17–30. doi:10.4324/9781003127611-3. ISBN 978-1-003-12761-1. S2CID 236582804.
- Egles-Zanden, N.; Hyllman, P. (2007). "Evaluating Strategies for Negotiating Workers' Rights in Transnational Corporations: The Effects of Codes of Conducts and Global Agreements on Workplace Democracy". Journal of Business Ethics. 76 (2): 207–23. doi:10.1007/s10551-006-9269-0. hdl:2077/18843. S2CID 53417432.
- Fabricant, N.; Gustafson, B. (2015). "Moving Beyond the Extractivism Debate, Imagining New Social Economies". NACLA Report on the Americas. 47 (4): 40–45. doi:10.1080/10714839.2014.11721813. S2CID 157781158. ProQuest 1656156999.
- Gizbert-Studnicki, D (2016). "Canadian mining in Latin America (1990 to present): a provisional history". Canadian Journal of Latin American and Caribbean Studies. 41: 95–113. doi:10.1080/08263663.2015.1134498. S2CID 155769679.
- Klein, Naomi (2015-03-08). "How will everything change under climate change?". the Guardian.
- Lopez, E.; Vertiz, F. (2015). "Extractivism, Transnational Capital and Subaltern Struggles in Latin America" (PDF). Latin American Perspectives. 42 (5): 152–68. doi:10.1177/0094582X14549538. S2CID 154338050.
- Reikoff, L (2014). "Legislating corporate social responsibility: expanding social disclosure through the resource extraction disclosure rule". Minnesota Law Review. 89 (6): 2435–78.
