= Euro Currency Index =

Index for the value of the Euro

Weighting of the currencies to the euro
Currency	Code	Weight in %
US dollar	USD	25
Sterling	GBP	25
Japanese yen	JPY	25
Swiss franc	CHF	25

The Euro Currency Index (EUR_I) represents the arithmetic mean of four major currencies against the Euro: the American dollar, British sterling, the Japanese yen and the Swiss franc. All ratios are expressed in units of currency per Euro. The index was launched in 2004 by the exchange portal Stooq.com. Underlying are 100 points on 4 January 1971. Before the introduction of the European single currency on 1 January 1999 an exchange rate of 1 euro = DM 1.95583 was calculated.

Based on the progression, the Euro Currency Index can show the strength or weakness of the euro. A rising index indicates an appreciation of the euro against the currencies in the currency basket, a falling index in contrast, a devaluation. Relationships to commodity indices are recognizable. A rising Euro Currency Index means a tendency of falling commodity prices. This is especially true for agricultural commodities and the price of oil. Even the prices of precious metals (gold and silver) are correlated with the index.

The arithmetically-weighted Euro Currency Index can be compared with the trade-weighted euro effective exchange rate index of the European Central Bank (ECB). The ECB index measures the value of the Euro much more accurately than the Euro Currency Index, since the competitiveness of European goods in comparison to other countries and trading partners is included in it.

== Former Euro Currency Indexes ==
=== Dow Jones & Company ===
On September 13, 2005 Dow Jones & Company published two versions of the index, the Dow Jones Euro Currency Index (DJEURO) and the Dow Jones Euro Currency 5 Index (DJEURO5). Underlying of each were 100 points on 31 December 1998.

- Dow Jones Euro Currency Index: Index measured the changes in value of the euro against 10 currencies: the US dollar, the yen, sterling, the Swiss Franc, the rouble, the Swedish krona, the won, the Canadian dollar, the New Taiwan dollar and the Australian dollar.
- Dow Jones Euro Currency 5 Index: It was a key figure, which compared the value of the Euro by a basket of currencies of five of the world's most liquid currencies: the US dollar, the Japanese yen, Sterling, the Swiss franc and Australian dollar.

The calculation of the Dow Jones Euro Currency 5 Index was set on 29 August 2008 (last value 121.97 points) and the calculation of the Dow Jones Euro Currency Index on 9 January 2009 (last value 119.41 points).

=== New York Board of Trade ===
The Euro Currency Index (ECX, also EURX or EXY) was launched on 13 January 2006 by the New York Board of Trade (NYBOT) and calculated back to 2001. In 2007, the IntercontinentalExchange (ICE) based in Atlanta (USA) changed the name of the stock exchange in IntercontinentalExchange The index was a ratio that compared the value of the euro by a currency basket of five currencies: US dollar (31.55 percent), sterling (30.56 percent), yen (18.91 percent), Swiss franc (11.13 percent) and the Swedish krona (7.85 percent).

The ECX was the geometrically weighted average compared to these currencies. The formula for the calculation was 34.38805726 multiplied by the product of all components in the basket of currencies, that have been raised to a high number of their percentage, weighting equal to:

ECX = 34.38805726 x (EURUSD^(0.3155) x EURGBP^(0.3056) x EURJPY^(0.1891) x EURCHF^(0.1113) x EURSEK^(0.0785))

The all-time low was constructed on 6 July 2001, with 83.36 points and the all-time high on July 14, 2008, 123.82 points. On 20 May 2011, the exchange ICE Futures U.S. ended the trading of futures and options on the index. On July 28, 2011, the calculation of the ICE Euro Currency Index was discontinued (last value was 108.88 points).

=== Historical overview ===
The Euro Currency Index started on 4 January 1971 with 100 points. Before the introduction of the European single currency on 1 January 1999, an exchange rate of 1 euro = DM 1.95583 was calculated.

On April 19, 1971, the Euro Currency Index gained 99.67 points calculated with an all-time low. Until 3 December 1979, the index rose by 68.0 percent to 167.43 points. With the depreciation of the D–Mark against the major currencies, the index fell to mid-1980s. On 3 May 1985, the Euro Currency Index was at level 122.26 points, up by 27.0 percent. The strength of the D–Mark against almost all global currencies set the index in the following years to rise again. On 5 October 1992, a value of 195.98 points was determined. The increase in 1985 was 60.3 percent. On 25 October 2000, the index closed at 130.83 points, up by 33.2 percent.

In 2000 began a multi-year upward movement of the euro. On 29 December 2008, the index marked 209.65 points, an all-time high. The profit since year 2000 is 60.2 percent. In the course of the international financial crisis, from which the U.S. real estate crisis originated in the summer of 2007, the index began to decline. On 6 February 2009 a value of 187.84 points was determined. In the following eight months, the European single currency rebounded from the lows. On 13 October 2009, the index rose by 208.45 points, near its historical high point.

A financial crisis in several member states of the Euro zone in 2010 led to the outbreak of the euro crisis. Particularly affected is Greece (see Greek government-debt crisis from 2010), but also other countries such as Ireland, Spain, Italy and Portugal. The weakness of the Euro against almost all global currencies caused the index to fall from 29 June 2010 to 175.31 points. In the following months, the European Stability Mechanism was developed, which provides for mutual assistance in case of emergency to avoid the bankruptcy of the Member States. By May 4, 2011, the index rose to a level of 200.20 points. With the intensification of the sovereign debt crisis in the Euro zone, the Euro Currency Index fell 24 July 2012 with 168.38 points, its lowest level since March 29, 2006. Compared to the all-time high of 29 December 2008, this represents a decrease of 19.7 percent.

=== Yearly trend ===
The below table shows the annual high, low and closing levels of the back-calculated Euro Currency Index from 1971 until 2012.

Year	High	Low	Close
1971	105,76	99,67	103,79
1972	106,91	101,56	106,28
1973	133,42	105,57	120,13
1974	130,80	117,11	130,45
1975	135,29	124,48	126,66
1976	148,74	126,67	146,40
1977	149,30	141,95	146,82
1978	157,31	141,08	154,70
1979	167,43	149,97	164,67
1980	165,01	137,39	137,70
1981	138,94	124,77	133,45
1982	139,52	129,83	137,91
1983	142,93	126,48	127,08
1984	133,20	123,55	126,24
1985	137,49	122,26	137,49
1986	162,47	137,02	162,47
1987	169,77	158,97	168,30
1988	167,61	150,35	155,18
1989	174,94	150,48	174,76
1990	179,22	168,80	177,45
1991	179,08	161,18	176,62
1992	195,98	169,03	183,87
1993	187,92	166,07	170,41
1994	181,33	168,27	178,22
1995	189,22	177,77	184,99
1996	187,67	176,47	177,83
1997	178,89	154,92	162,30
1998	175,18	158,28	168,33
1999	170,77	146,99	147,23
2000	150,34	130,83	144,25
2001	147,75	135,56	141,40
2002	154,17	138,90	153,79
2003	172,59	152,55	172,06
2004	178,19	162,30	177,23
2005	177,49	163,65	167,23
2006	175,37	166,24	174,84
2007	191,00	171,38	189,41
2008	209,65	177,50	204,78
2009	208,45	187,84	199,47
2010	202,21	175,31	186,11
2011	200,24	179,67	179,89
2012¹	185,17	168,38	180,38

¹ 31. December 2012
