= John Hamilton (farmer) =

Scottish farmer

John Hamilton was a Scottish farmer known for pioneering sheep farming in southern Patagonia and his stewardship of rural properties in the Falkland Islands. Hamilton was a native of Caithness where his father was a tailor. In 1888 he participated in the Gran arreo. In the early 1900s Hamilton, Thomas Saunders and Bevil Molesworth formed Sociedad Pastoril de Glencross, legally inscribed in Valparaíso, to administer their lands in the middle course of Gallegos River. In total Sociedad Pastoril de Glencross owned 160,500 ha. With Sounders he also owned The Patagonian Land and State Company. In the 1920s and 1930 he purchased a series of islands around West Falkland including Weddell Island, Passage Islands, and Saunders Island. John Hamilton administered these islands in an unusual way for the time, reducing sheep numbers, he introduced pasture rotation, replanting of native tussac grass, introduced Cupressus macrocarpa as windbreaks and attempted afforestation. From Patagonia he imported guanacos whose descendants numbered about 400 in 2003 in on Staats Island. However, Hamilton's introduction of gray foxes from Patagonia to some of his and his associates islands proved ecologically disastrous.

== See also ==
- Patagonian sheep farming boom
- Tierra del Fuego gold rush
