= Trade-weighted US dollar index =

Measure of the relative value of the US dollar

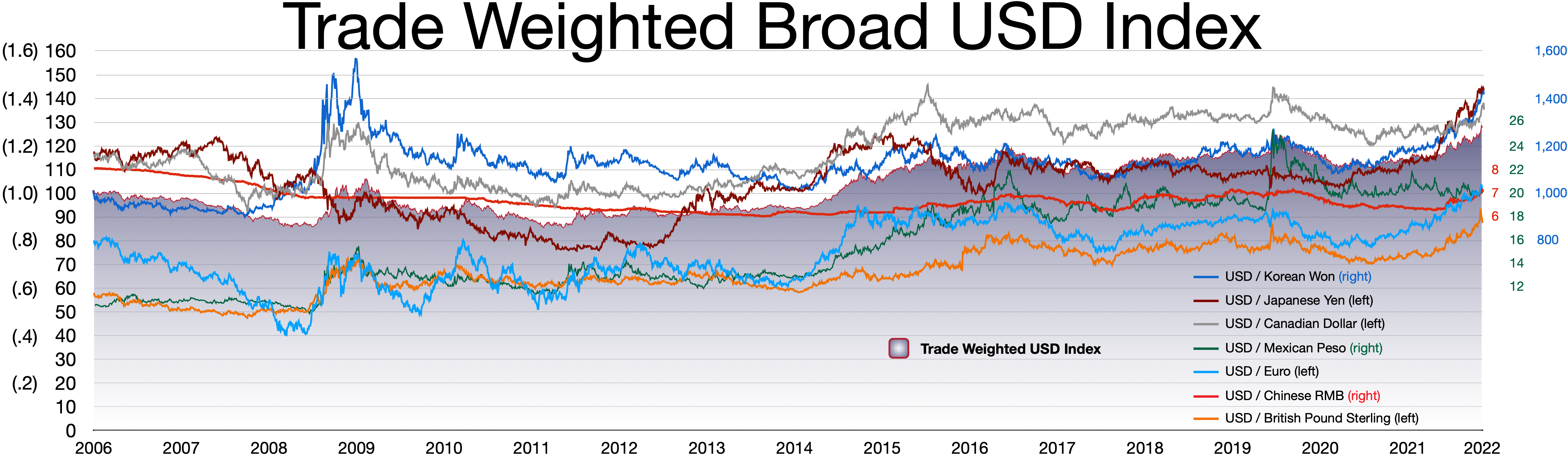
Trade-weighted US dollar index USD / South Korean won USD / Japanese Yen USD / Canadian dollar USD / Mexican peso USD / Euro USD / Chinese Renminbi USD / British Pound Sterling

The trade-weighted US dollar index, also known as the broad index, was a measure of the value of the United States dollar relative to other world currencies. It was a trade weighted index that improved on the older U.S. Dollar Index by incorporating more currencies and yearly rebalancing. The base index value was 100 in January 2006.

== History ==
The trade-weighted dollar index was introduced in 1998 for two primary reasons. The first was the introduction of the euro, which eliminated several of the currencies in the standard dollar index; the second was to keep pace with new developments in US trade.

== Included currencies ==
In the older U.S. Dollar Index, a significant weight was given to the euro, because most U. S. Trade in 1973 was with European countries. As U. S. trade expanded over time, the weights in that index went unchanged and became out of date. To more accurately reflect the strength of the dollar relative to other world currencies, the Federal Reserve created the trade-weighted US dollar index, which included a bigger collection of currencies than the US dollar index. The regions included were:

- Europe (euro countries)
- Canada
- Japan
- Mexico
- China
- United Kingdom
- Taiwan
- Korea
- Singapore
- Hong Kong
- Malaysia
- Brazil
- Switzerland
- Thailand
- Philippines
- Australia
- Vietnam (added February 4, 2019)
- Indonesia
- India
- Israel
- Saudi Arabia
- Russia
- Sweden
- Argentina
- Venezuela (removed February 4, 2019)
- Chile
- Colombia

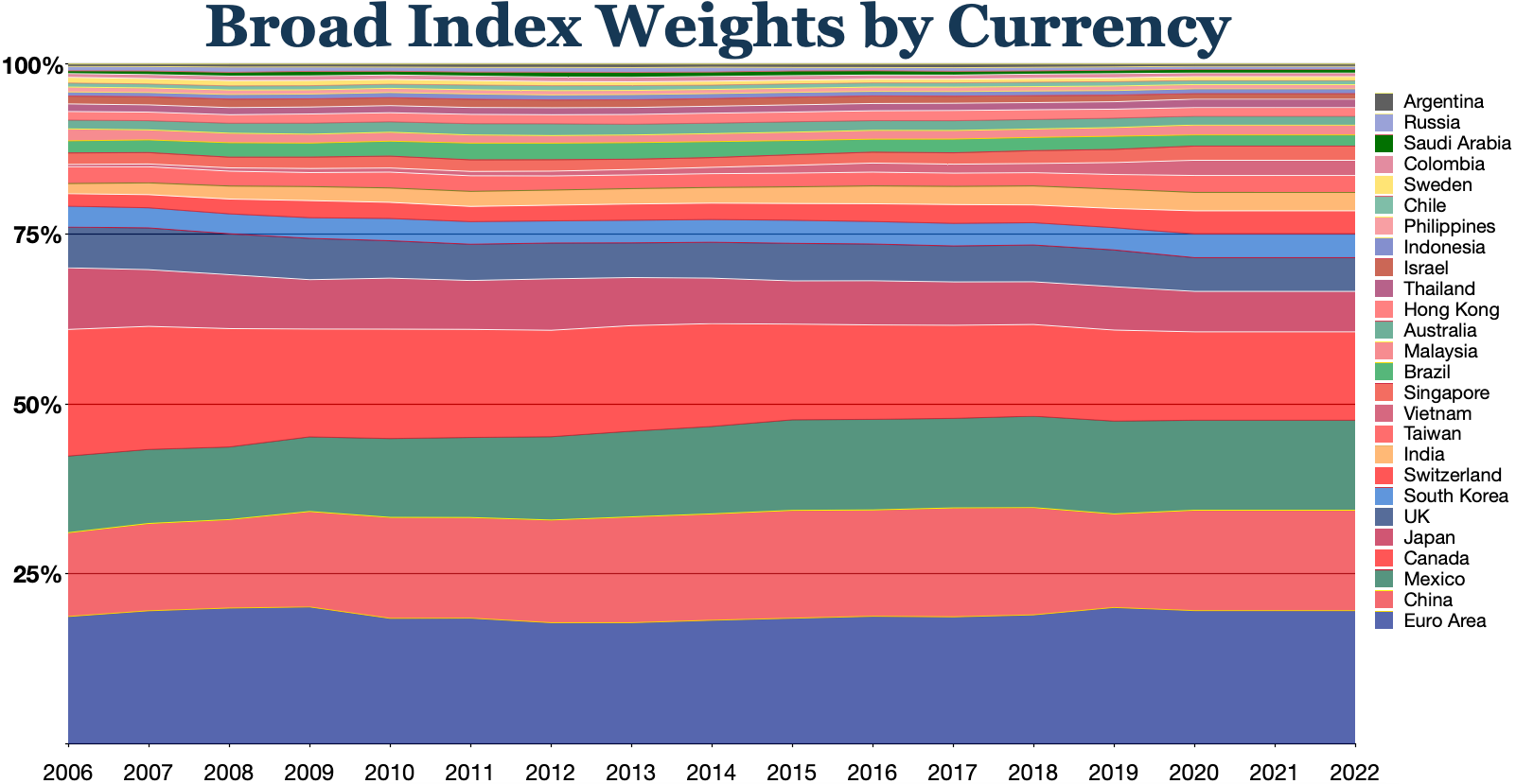
Broad Index weights

== Mathematical formulation ==
=== Based on nominal exchange rates ===
The index is computed as the geometric mean of the bilateral exchange rates of the included currencies. The weight assigned to the value of each currency in the calculation is based on trade data, and is updated annually (the value of the index itself is updated much more frequently than the weightings). The index value at time $t$ is given by the formula:

$$I_t = I_{t-1} \times \prod_{j = 1}^{N(t)} \left( \frac{e_{j,t}}{e_{j,t-1}} \right)^{w_{j,t}}$$.

where

- $I_t$ and $I_{t-1}$ are the values of the index at times $t$ and $t-1$
- $N(t)$ is the number of currencies in the index at time $t$
- $e_{j,t}$ and $e_{j,t-1}$ are the amount of currency $j$ required to purchase one U.S. Dollar at times $t$ and $t-1$
- $w_{j,t}$ is the weight of currency $j$ at time $t$
- and $\sum_{j=1}^{N(t)} w_{j,t} = 1$

=== Based on real exchange rates ===
The real exchange rate is a more informative measure of the dollar's worth since it accounts for countries whose currencies experience differing rates of inflation from that of the United States. This is compensated for by adjusting the exchange rates in the formula using the consumer price index of the respective countries. In this more general case the index value is given by:

$$I_t = I_{t-1} \times \prod_{j = 1}^{N(t)} \left( \frac{e_{j,t} \cdot \frac{p_t}{p_{j,t}}}{e_{j,t-1}\cdot \frac{p_{t-1}}{p_{j,t-1}}} \right)^{w_{j,t}}$$.

where

- $p_t$ and $p_{t-1}$ are the values of the US consumer price index at times $t$ and $t-1$
- and $p_{j,t}$ and $p_{j,t-1}$ are the values of the country $j$'s consumer price index at times $t$ and $t-1$

== Federal Reserve Bank of St. Louis data ==
The Federal Reserve Bank of St. Louis, provides "weighted averages of the foreign exchange value of the U.S. dollar against the currencies of a broad group of major U.S. trading partners" with detailed information. The "broad currency index includes the Euro Area, Canada, Japan, Mexico, China, United Kingdom, Taiwan, Korea, Singapore, Hong Kong, Malaysia, Brazil, Switzerland, Thailand, Philippines, Australia, Indonesia, India, Israel, Saudi Arabia, Russia, Sweden, Argentina, Venezuela, Chile and Colombia."

This table shows some highs and lows of the Trade Weighted U.S. Dollar Index: Broad [TWEXB] from 2002 to April 2017.

Sample of trade weighted averages of foreign exchange value USD (highs/lows ) DMY
20-02-2002	09-04-2008	23-07-2011	27-07-2011	18-03-2015	03-06-2015	17-02-2016	04-05-2016	26-08-2016	23-11-2016	04-01-2017	19-04-2017
129.3639	95.6084	102.1682	94.0323	117.4927	115.5347	123.7823	118.6478	120.2955	127.2899	128.5246	124.0479

== Series Discontinued ==
=== TWEXB Discontinued after December 31, 2019 ===
This series was discontinued after December 31, 2019.

The series Nominal Broad U.S. Dollar Index (DTWEXBGS) is the suggested substitute, DTWEXBGS.
