= Patagonian sheep farming boom =

19th- and 20th-century South American agricultural movement

Location of some localities mentioned in the article.

In late 19th and early 20th centuries, sheep farming expanded across the Patagonian Steppe making the southern regions of Argentina and Chile one of the world's foremost sheep farming areas. The sheep farming boom attracted thousands of immigrants from Chiloé and Europe to southern Patagonia. Early sheep farming in Patagonia was oriented towards wool production but changed over time with the development of industrial refrigerators towards meat export. Besides altering the demographic and economic outlook of Southern Patagonia the sheep farming boom also changed the steppe ecosystem.

Sheep farming in Patagonia was carried out in an estancia system. Each of these estancias was administered from a casco central (a central complex of buildings) where administrators, foremen and workers lived.

Sociedad Explotadora de Magallanes possessed more than 200,000 sheep by 1901.

== Development ==
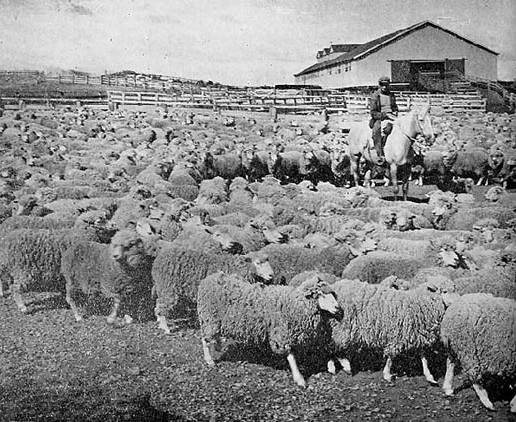
Tierra del Fuego sheep ranch in 1942. That was the region's primary activity at that time, but that has been affected by the decline in the global wool market as much as by petroleum and gas extraction.

In 1843, Chile established a colony in Brunswick Peninsula to assert sovereignty over the strategic Strait of Magellan. Early sheep herding activity in the Chilean colony was very modest. The first men to realize the potential for large-scale sheep herding in the lands around the Strait of Magellan were a group of British immigrants that settled in Punta Arenas in the 1870s, following its development in the Falkland islands.

The first successful attempt at sheep farming in the Straits of Magellan is credited to the Englishman Henry Reynard (Spanish: Enrique Reynard) who raised sheep in 1877 on Isabel Island. These sheep were brought to the Straits of Magellan by Chilean governor Diego Dublé Almeyda who travelled specifically for that purpose to the Falkland Islands in the corvette Chacabuco in 1876. In Port Stanley he bought 300 sheep and back in Chile he sold them to Henry Reynard. By 1878, this first sheep-raising experiment was considered a success and it created a huge demand for land among individuals who attempted to establish their own sheep-raising businesses. Strong networks of racialized corruption strengthened the British control on lands, commerce and political influence and favored the displacement of indigenous peoples in the continental area and the Selk'nam genocide in Tierra del Fuego.

=== Beyond the Strait of Magellan ===
All the best sheep-herding areas along the Strait had been leased or reserved by 1884. At this point the governor of the Argentine territory of Santa Cruz Carlos María Moyano travelled to the Falkland Islands where he promised cheap rental of land for any farmer that moved in to the scarcely populated territory. A group of five settlers who arrived this way, Henry Jamieson, John Hamilton, William Saunders, Mac Clain and George Mac George set up a plan to quickly set up large sheep farms. These men went in 1888 to Buenos Aires and then to Río Negro where they purchased thousands of sheep, horses and supplies. All sheep, herders, horses and supplies gathered at the Argentine outpost of Fortín Conesa from where they departed south on September 8. The herders followed a route along the coast similar to modern National Route 3 for hundreds of kilometers until reaching their land grants in the territory of Santa Cruz. As movement of livestock of this magnitude was unheard of the region the feat was later baptised as El Gran Arreo or The Great Herding by writer José Salvador Borerro Rivera.

In Chile, sheep farming expanded from the Strait of Magellan to the area around Última Esperanza Sound where in 1893 that the first estancia was established. Attempts to establish a cattle farming business by entrepreneur Daniel Cruz Ramírez around 1899 in Muñoz Gamero Peninsula failed given the humid climate and swampy terrain.

=== Chilean auctions of 1903–1906 ===
When most of the land leases around the Strait of Magellan expired around 1902, the Chilean government decided to auction the lands. This was possibly due to pressure from commercial interests in Valparaíso and Santiago that had come to realize how profitable sheep raising in Magallanes was. Chilean and foreign entrepreneurs that had leased the lands sought to be able to purchase the land directly from the state but were unsuccessful in their attempts. The first actions begun on March 20, 1903.

Sheep farms around Última Esperanza Sound was initially unaffected by the auctions but on 15 March 1905, these lands too were auctioned. Sociedad Explotadora de Tierra del Fuego became the main landowner in the area establishing its local estancia headquarters in Cerro Castillo.

In a few days' time half a dozen companies had been formed with big capitals, and in order to save their homes the colonists formed themselves into one company, the United Estancias of Ultima Esperanza. At the auction there were wild scenes, enormous bids were made, and lots were sold at prices ten times their true value. The result was that most of the purchasers could not pay at the proper time

— Carl Skottsberg about the auctions on 15 March 1905.

When the auctions finished in September 1906, three companies owned by a total of 18 individuals owned most of the land suitable for sheep farming around the Strait. Many of the early sheep farming pioneers were not able to continue in business as owners, but some did. The concentration of land in a few properties gave land tenure in Magallanes as a latifundium structure. This increased concentration of land ownership faced criticism from authors like Lautaro Navarro who in 1908 wrote "...what was appropriate for the Territory was subivision [of land into smaller properties] as means to increase the population and give land access to small capitalists who wished to establish estancias in their own lands". (Note: lo que convenía al Territorio era la subdivisión como medio de aumentar su población i dar así acceso a tantos pequeños capitalistas que querían establecer estancias en campos propios.) With particular reference to the Última Esperanza area Swedish explorer Carl Skottsberg was also critical of the auctions and the resulting changes in land property, in his book The Wilds of Patagonia (1911) he wrote: "I can hardly believe that the revolution was favourable to Chile's interests, and I daresay that is a rather ugly page in the history of a so-called democratic people. Men who knew Patagonia before and now say that the "star of Ultima Esperanza sank when the all-mighty company became its master."

Interesting article in Berkshire History Society about the Waldron and Payne families of Lambourn and Peasemore House who were some of the early western settlers https://berksfhs.org/sheep-farming-in-patagonia/ They founded "The Patagonian Wool Company".

== End of the boom ==
During the 1910s, the economy of Magallanes faced several challenges such as the decline in sea traffic as a result of the opening of Panama Canal in 1914 and the establishment of customs in Punta Arenas. From 1912 until 1922, a powerful multinational labor movement originated in Punta Arenas and expanded throughout southern Patagonia, confronting the powerful coalition of Argentinean and Chilean authorities and foreign landowners. It did face a strong repression between 1918 and 1922, culminating in the Patagonia rebelde. In 1920, in the aftermath of the First World War, the price of wool had dropped significantly provoking an economic crisis in the sheep-breeding Argentine Patagonia. The sheep farming economy came to face increased social unrest, such as the events of Patagonia Rebelde, and addition to competition from New Zealand sheep farmers. After recognising the concentrated land tenure as a cause of social tensions, Chilean authorities begun in the 1930s efforts to redistribute land and diversify the economy. Finally, in the 1950s, oil began to be extracted from oil platforms in the Strait of Magellan, effectively ending the dependence on sheep farming for the local economy.

== Ecological impact ==
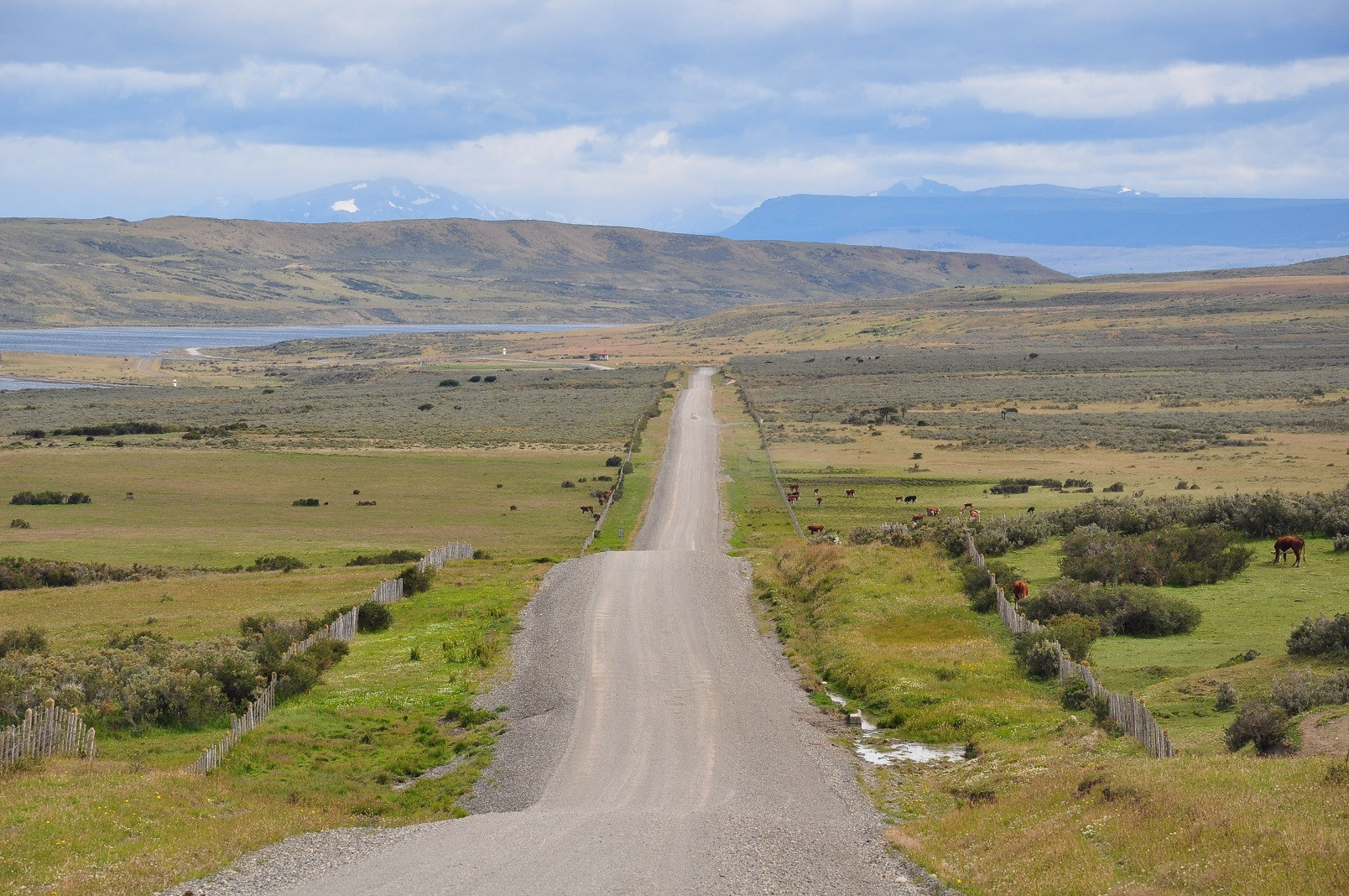
Natural grasslands along Chile Route Y-50 near Riesco Island, 70 km north of Punta Arenas.

The sheep farming boom altered not only the demographic and economic outlook of Southern Patagonia, but also changed the steppe ecosystem. Research suggests that sheep excrement might have caused eutrophication of lagoons like Potrok Aike, and sheep might also have caused considerable erosion. The Strait of Magellan and the Atlantic coast were covered by natural grasslands so no clearing of forests occurred during the introduction of sheep.

== See also ==
- Amazon rubber boom
- Argentine beef
- New Zealand wool boom
- Patagonia rebelde
