= U.S. Dollar Index =

Economic measure of US dollar exchange rates

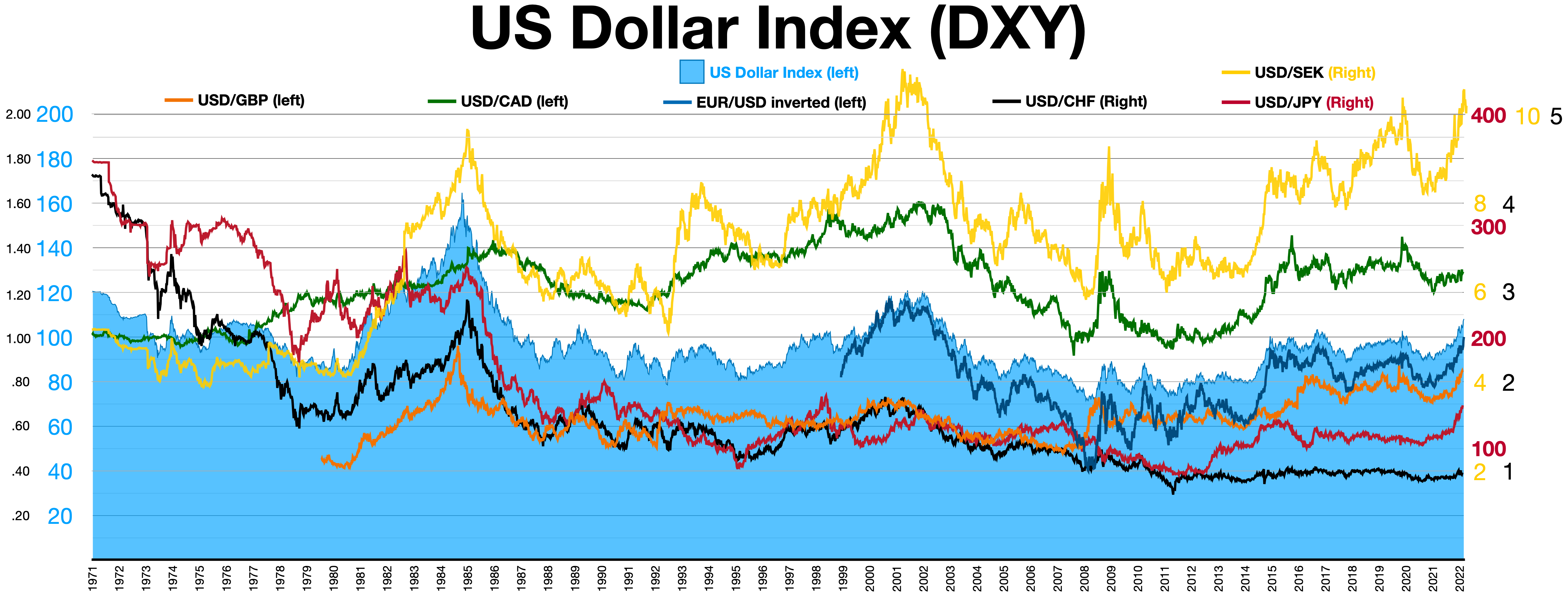
US Dollar Index (DXY) USD/GBP exchange rate USD/CAD exchange rate EUR/USD (inverted) exchange rate USD/JPY exchange rate USD/SEK exchange rate USD/CHF exchange rate

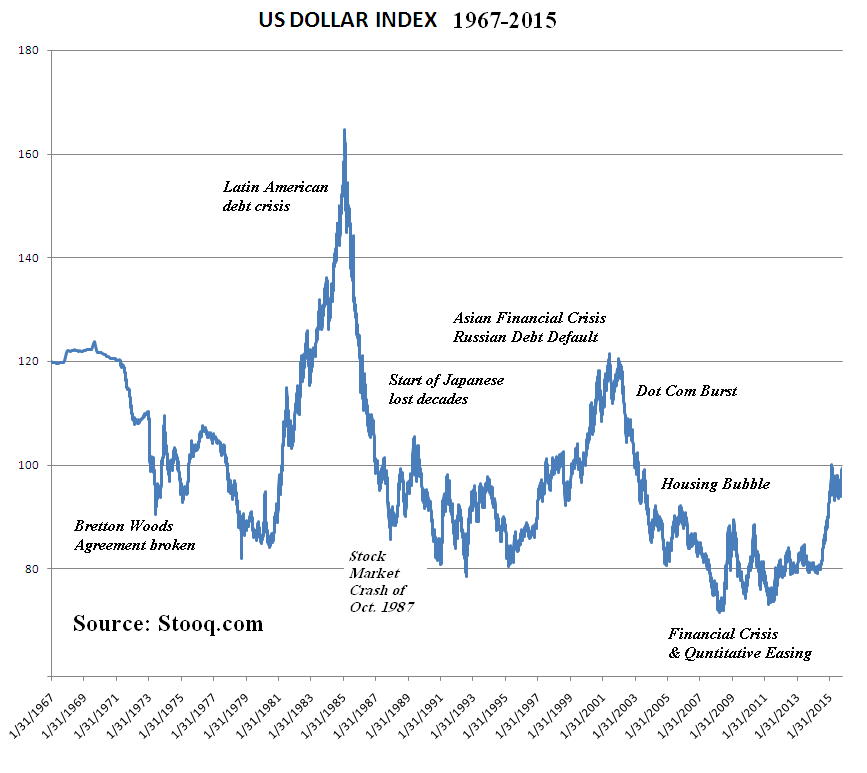
US Dollar Index and major financial events

The U.S. Dollar Index (USDX, DXY, DX, or, informally, the "Dixie") is an index (or measure) of the value of the United States dollar relative to a basket of foreign currencies, often referred to as a basket of U.S. trade partners' currencies. The Index goes up when the U.S. dollar gains "strength" (value) when compared to other currencies.

The index is designed, maintained, and published by ICE (Intercontinental Exchange, Inc.), with the name "U.S. Dollar Index" as a registered trademark.

It is a weighted geometric mean of the dollar's value relative to each of the following select currencies:

- Euro (EUR), 57.6% weight
- Japanese yen (JPY), 13.6% weight
- Pound sterling (GBP), 11.9% weight
- Canadian dollar (CAD), 9.1% weight
- Swedish krona (SEK), 4.2% weight
- Swiss franc (CHF), 3.6% weight

== History ==
USDX started in March 1973, soon after the dismantling of the Bretton Woods system. At its start, the value of the U.S. Dollar Index was 100.000. It has since traded as high as 164.720 in February 1985, and as low as 70.698 on March 16, 2008.

The makeup of the "basket" has been altered only once, when several European currencies were subsumed by the euro at the start of 1999. Some commentators have said that the makeup of the "basket" is overdue for revision as China, Mexico, South Korea and Brazil are major trading partners presently which are not part of the index whereas Sweden and Switzerland continue as part of the index in spite of their trade volume with the US being much less relevant than in the early 1970s.

Year (last business day)	DXY close	Factors
1967	121.79	Gold standard kept dollar at $35/oz.
1968	121.96	Consumer price index (CPI) begins to break out. Richard Nixon elected president in a climate of national unrest.
1969	121.74	Dollar hit 123.82 on 9/30.
1970	120.64	Recession of 1969-1970 ends.
1971	111.21	President Richard Nixon announces the closing of the gold window and the institution of wage-price controls.
1972	110.14	Beginning of stagflation in response to the Nixon shock. Richard Nixon re-elected on a landslide.
1973	102.39	Gold standard effectively ended; 1973 oil crisis takes place. Index created in March. Paris Peace Accords.
1974	97.29	Nixon resigns as a result of the Watergate scandal; Gerald Ford becomes president.
1975	103.51	Interest rate lowered.
1976	104.56	Jimmy Carter elected president. 1976 sterling crisis
1977	96.44	Effective Federal Funds Rate goes below 5%. The American economy rebounds after several years of stagnation.
1979	85.82	The Nicaraguan and Iranian revolutions as well as the 1979 oil crisis take place. Inflation accelerates in the U.S. Winter of Discontent and election of Margaret Thatcher in the United Kingdom
1980	90.39	The early 1980s recession begins. Ronald Reagan elected president. Silver Thursday.
1981	104.69	Economic Recovery Tax Act of 1981 passed by Congress; signed into law by President Reagan in August 1981. Commodity prices plummet.
1982	117.91	The early 1980s recession ends, leading to an economic boom and peacetime record levels of growth in the US. Latin American debt crisis and Falklands War. Unemployment crisis in the United Kingdom.
1983	131.79	Emergency increases in taxes and defense spending are put into place; this was caused by the Tax Equity and Fiscal Responsibility Act of 1982.
1984	151.47	Fed funds rate crosses over 11%. Ronald Reagan re-elected on a landslide. Year-on-year GDP growth reaches 6.8%, the highest in the United States to date (not counting the wartime 1941–45 period).
1985	123.55	Record of 163.83 on March 5. Plaza Accord.
1986	104.24	Consolidated Omnibus Budget Reconciliation Act of 1985 and Tax Reform Act of 1986 signed into law by President Reagan; Internal Revenue Code enacted. Start of the Savings and loan crisis. US GDP growth decreases sharply from the 1983–1985 boom, setting off a period of instability. "Big Bang" in the London Stock Exchange.
1987	85.66	Black Monday. Iran-Contra scandal.
1988	92.29	Fed raised rates; Omnibus Foreign Trade and Competitiveness Act passed; George H. W. Bush elected president.
1989	93.93	Yield curve inverts as the federal reserve does not respond significantly to the prolonged economic malaise. Black Friday. Fall of the Berlin Wall and revolutions in Eastern Europe.
1990	83.89	Early 1990s recession begins; Omnibus Budget Reconciliation Act of 1990 passed. German reunification. The Japanese asset bubble collapses, marking the beginning of the country's so-called "Lost Decade".
1991	84.69	Persian Gulf War takes places during the second year of the recession. Collapse of the Soviet Union.
1992	93.87	NAFTA approved by George H. W. Bush; Bill Clinton elected president. Black Wednesday and collapse of the European Exchange Rate Mechanism.
1993	97.63	Balanced Budget Act and Omnibus Budget Reconciliation Act of 1993 both passed. The economy begins to recover from the early 1990s recession, leading to the longest continued period of economic growth in the United States as of 2025.
1994	88.69	Marrakesh Agreement signed; United States becomes a founding member of the World Trade Organization.
1995	84.83	Fed raised rate slightly from 5.45 to 5.6 as concerns of inflation from an economic boom grew. The Bosnian War ends.
1996	87.86	Fed funds rate falls slightly from 5.6 to 5.29 as inflation concerns are abated. Unemployment rate falls slightly from 5.6 to 5.4. Bill Clinton is reelected by a large margin during a period of sustained economic growth and international stability from a unipolar world order. The bipartisan Personal Responsibility and Work Opportunity Act reduces government spending on welfare.
1997	99.57	1997 Asian financial crisis; LTCM reform approved.
1998	93.95	1998 Russian financial crisis; Clinton impeached by House of Representatives. The treasury enters a period of budget surplus. Dot-com boom as non-tech GDP growth begins to stagnate.
1999	101.42	Clinton acquitted by the Senate; Gramm–Leach–Bliley Act passed.
2000	109.13	Treasury budget surplus peaks. Dot-com bubble collapses; George W. Bush elected President after a Supreme Court battle over the election recount in Florida.
2001	117.21	Recession took place from March–November 2001; Economic Growth and Tax Relief Reconciliation Act of 2001 passed; dollar rose to 118.54 on 12/24 after the September 11 attacks.
2002	102.26	Euro launched as a hard currency at $.90.
2003	87.38	United States invasion of Iraq; Jobs and Growth Tax Relief Reconciliation Act of 2003 passed.
2004	81.00	American Jobs Creation Act of 2004 passed. George W. Bush re-elected.
2005	90.96	War on terror doubled debt; dollar weakened; Hurricane Katrina affects Louisiana. Domestic opposition to the Iraq War increases.
2006	83.43	Tax Relief and Health Care Act of 2006 passed. Concerns about the economy and subprime loans mount.
2007	76.70	Euro rose to $1.47; The Great Recession began in December 2007.
2008	82.15	Record low of 71.30 on 3/17; Economic Stimulus Act of 2008 passed; Public Law 110-343 goes into effect in October 2008; Barack Obama elected president. Fannie Mae and Freddie Mac collapse and are absorbed into the federal government. Lehman Brothers goes bankrupt.
2009	77.92	American Recovery and Reinvestment Act of 2009 passed; ECB lowered rates; first period of quantitative easing (QE1) begins; 2009 flu pandemic begins in Mexico (pandemic ended in August 2010).
2010	78.96	Second period of quantitative easing (QE2) begins; Tax Relief, Unemployment Insurance Reauthorization, and Job Creation Act of 2010 passed; beginning of Arab Spring in November 2010
2011	80.21	Syrian civil war and Libyan Crisis begin; Osama bin Laden killed; Operation Twist initiated; European sovereign debt crisis begins; Budget Control Act of 2011 passed.
2012	79.77	Third period of quantitative easing (QE3) begins; Hurricane Sandy affects the northeastern states; American Taxpayer Relief Act of 2012 passed. Barack Obama re-elected.
2013	80.04	United States budget sequestration in 2013 necessary to address the United States fiscal cliff; 2013 United States government shutdown occurs; West Africa Ebola virus epidemic begins.
2014	90.28	2010s oil glut; Euromaidan crisis in Ukraine; Greek debt crisis reaches its midpoint.
2015	98.69	Fed raised rates; European migrant crisis accelerates; Donald Trump announces his candidacy for President.
2016	102.21	2016 Brexit referendum takes place in the United Kingdom; Donald Trump elected president.
2017	92.12	EU strengthened; Hurricane Harvey affects Texas, Louisiana, and Arkansas; Tax Cuts and Jobs Act of 2017 passed.
2018	96.17	First Trump tariffs began to be imposed; First North Korean–US summit takes place; Hurricane Florence affects North Carolina, South Carolina, and Virginia; Hurricane Michael affects Florida, Alabama, and Georgia; Alexandria Ocasio-Cortez and several other progressive Democratic candidates elected in the midterm elections; 2018–2019 United States federal government shutdown occurs.
2019	96.54	Trump seen on North Korean soil; Lebanese liquidity crisis begins; Fed begins acting as role in investor to provide funds in the repo markets; Abu Bakr al-Baghdadi killed on October 27; first case of COVID-19 discovered in China; Trump impeached by House of Representatives on December 18.
2020	93.27	Qasem Soleimani killed on January 3; Trump acquitted of impeachment on February 11; COVID-19 declared a pandemic by the World Health Organization on March 11; George Floyd protests begin on May 31. Joe Biden elected president.
2021	89.21	First dip below 90 since 2013; Increased pandemic stimulus payment prospects after Democrats take Senate control in the Georgia runoff election.
2022	110.05	Fed raised rates; increased pandemic by Omicron Variant and the imminent end of the pandemic. Also Russian invasion of Ukraine and energy crisis.
2023	101.33	Fed holds rates at 5.33 as YoY core inflation is reduced to below 4% and unemployment remains historically low at below 4%. Continuing China-United States trade war and government spending from the Build Back Better Plan impact economic growth and inflation. Concerns on middle east stability with the start of the Gaza war impact energy prices while the US became the largest producer of crude oil of any nation in history.
2024	108.49	Escalating geopolitical conflict in the Middle East, Fed cuts rates, Trump elected to second (non-consecutive) term

== Relation to Economic Growth in Developing Countries ==
Some scholars posit that the cyclical fluctuations in the Dollar Index, commonly referred to as the Dollar Cycle, are intricately linked to economic growth trends in developing nations. According to this hypothesis, a period of appreciation in the dollar, known as a dollar upcycle, tends to correlate with a decline in economic growth in emerging markets. Conversely, a period of depreciation, or a dollar downcycle, is associated with an increase in growth within these economies. The value of the U.S. dollar also correlates with global interest rates, particularly affecting borrowing costs for developing nations. When the USD depreciates, borrowing becomes cheaper and foreign investment increases. Conversely, USD appreciation raises interest rates, making borrowing more expensive and reducing the flow of foreign direct investment to these countries. Because most commodities are traded in U.S. dollars globally, a drop in the dollar's value often results in higher commodity prices in the local currencies of developing countries. This increase in prices can enhance local income and consumption, leading to economic growth. On the other hand, when the USD strengthens, commodity prices generally decline, which can hinder growth in these regions. Consequently, the economic development cycle in developing nations is closely linked to the cycle of commodity prices, which is driven by fluctuations in the USD.

== Trade-weighted USD Index ==
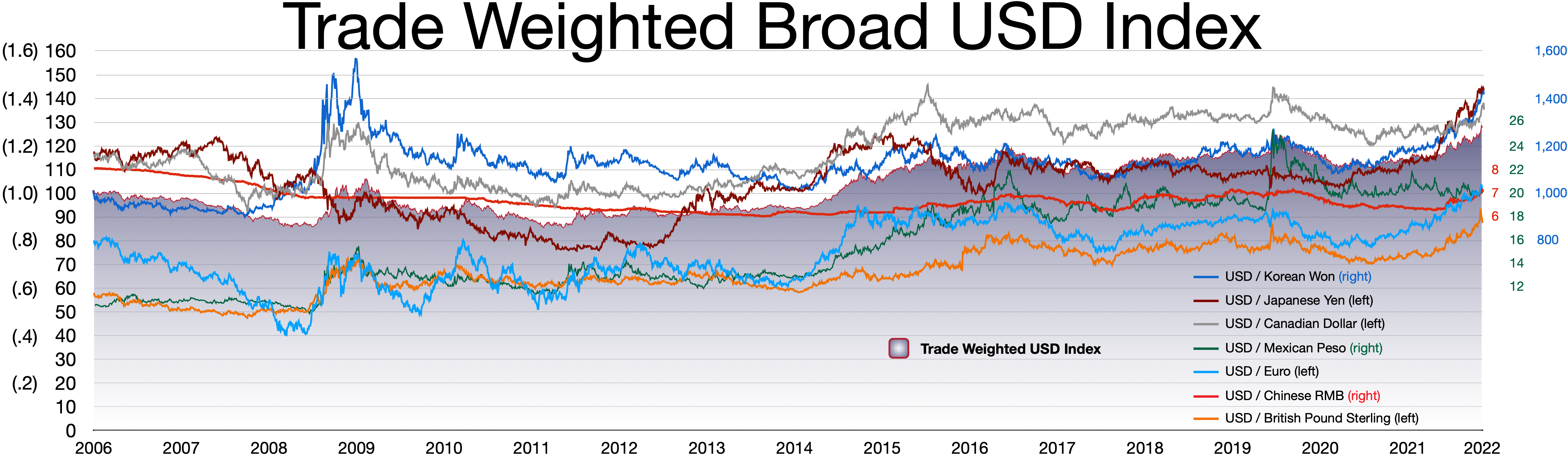
Trade-weighted US dollar index USD / South Korean won USD / Japanese Yen USD / Canadian dollar USD / Mexican peso USD / Euro USD / Chinese Renminbi USD / British Pound Sterling

The trade-weighted US dollar index is a currency index created by the Federal Reserve to measure the exchange rate of the United States dollar compared to the nations that it trades with the most, the more trade a country has with the United States the more that exchange rate weighs on the index. The index was created in 1998 during the creation of the Euro.

== Quotes ==
ICE provides live feeds for Dow Futures that appear on Bloomberg.com and CNN Money. USDX is updated whenever U.S. Dollar markets are open, which is from Sunday evening New York City local time (early Monday morning Asia time) for 24 hours a day to late Friday afternoon New York City local time.

== Calculation ==
The U.S. Dollar Index is calculated with this formula: USDX = 50.14348112 × EURUSD^{−0.576} × USDJPY^{0.136} × GBPUSD^{−0.119} × USDCAD^{0.091} × USDSEK^{0.042} × USDCHF^{0.036}

== Trading ==
US Dollar Index futures are traded for 21 hours a day on the ICE platform with futures having a March/June/September/December quarterly expiration cycle. The futures are physically settled and can be redeemed for the underlying currencies the third Wednesday after expiration. It is also available indirectly in exchange-traded funds (ETFs), options, contracts for difference and mutual funds.

== See also ==
- Trade-weighted US dollar index
- Special drawing rights
- Dow Jones FXCM Dollar Index
- Wall Street Journal Dollar Index
- 1976 sterling crisis
- Exchange rate regime
