= Dow Jones FXCM Dollar Index =

Economic indicator for the U.S. dollar

The Dow Jones FXCM Dollar Index (USDOLLAR) is an index (or measure) of the value of the United States dollar relative to a basket of four currencies: the Euro, the British Pound, the Japanese Yen, and the Australian Dollar.

== History ==
On its inception, January 1, 2011, USDOLLAR began with a value of 10,000. The index rises when the US dollar gains value against the other four currencies. The Index falls when the US Dollar loses value against the other currencies.

USDOLLAR is updated 24 hours a day from Sunday evening Eastern Time (early Monday morning Asia time) to late Friday afternoon Eastern Time. The index is calculated every 15 seconds, which allows the index to be used to benchmark U.S. dollar performance throughout the day.

== Components and Methodology ==
As of January 1, 2011, the Dow Jones FXCM Dollar Index was a measure of the U.S. dollar's value equally weighted against four of the world's most liquidly traded currencies:

- Euro (EUR), 25% initial weight
- British Pound sterling (GBP), 25% initial weight
- Japanese Yen (JPY), 25% initial weight
- Australian Dollar (AUD), 25% initial weight

The equation

$$\mbox{USDOLLAR} = (80000 - \mbox{EURUSD} \times 7479 - \mbox{GBPUSD} \times 6410 - 812150 \div \mbox{USDJPY} - \mbox{AUDUSD} \times 9787) \div 4$$

As time goes by, currency weightings will deviate from their original 25% as currency prices fluctuate. There are no regular scheduled rebalancings of the index components. To protect the index's integrity, the index administrator is alerted if any of the individual component currencies falls in value by more than 90% from its January 1, 2011 value.

The Dow Jones FXCM Dollar Index (USDOLLAR) is a collaboration between Dow Jones Indexes and FXCM. According to the index creators, it is formulated to address four of the major shortcomings of the older U.S. Dollar Index (USDX):

- Geographic Diversification: USDOLLAR shares exposure to currencies in both Europe (Euro and Pound sterling) and the fast-growing Asia-Pacific regions (Japanese Yen and Australian Dollar), with an even 25% weighting in each currency at inception. The USDX, reflecting its inception in 1973, is very heavy in European currencies, with a 58.6% weighting in the Euro alone, and a total 78.3% weighting in European currencies.
- Liquidity: The Euro, Pound, Yen, and Australian Dollar, when traded against the U.S. Dollar are the four most liquid currency pairs in the world. Typically, this means that trading costs, reflected in bid–offer spreads, tend to be low, and major market participants can generally easily trade in significant size.
- Simple Methodology: Whereas the USDX uses a weighted geometric mean formulation, USDOLLAR uses a weighted arithmetic mean formulation, which is a much more straightforward weighting of four equal parts that is left to run as the currencies fluctuate. This makes it easy to replicate, so it is much simpler for traders and market makers to track their positions and hedge their exposure to the index components. With a weighted geometric mean, hedgers need to constantly revise their hedge positions to account for changes in weighting. However, with a weighted arithmetic mean, hedgers do not need to revise their hedges as the markets move.

== See also ==
- Dow Jones Indexes
- U.S. Dollar Index
