= Effective exchange rate index =

Foreign exchange market

The effective exchange rate index describes the strength of a currency relative to a basket of other currencies. Although typically the basket is trade weighted, there are others besides the trade-weighted effective exchange rate index.

Ho (2012) proposed a new approach to compiling effective exchange rate indices. Under this approach, the effective exchange rate can be calculated as a ratio of the normalized exchange value of currency against the US dollar to the normalized exchange value of the benchmark currency basket against the US dollar. Normalized exchange rate refers to the current exchange rate divided by the exchange rate against the US dollar in the base year, which effectively scales up the exchange rate of a "small value" currency like the Japanese yen, worth a small fraction of a dollar, and scales down the exchange rate of a "big value" currency like the British pound, worth much more than a dollar. Thus, all standardized or normalized currencies in the base year are worth US$1 in the base year. The US dollar is used for convenience, but, in principle, any other currency could be used instead without affecting the results. The benchmark currency basket is a GDP-weighted basket of the major fully convertible currencies of the world. Since GDP data are available with a lag, the GDP weights used in Ho are GDPs dated two years ago. The use of GDP weights has been found to be superior to direct trade weights since countries with bigger GDPs will tend to attract imports from other countries, both direct and indirect.

Value of the benchmark currency basket at time t = Σ (GDP weight of currency i(dated 2 years ago from year of time t)* normalized exchange rate of currency i against the US dollar at time t;

Effective exchange rate of currency j = Normalized exchange rate of currency j against the US dollar/Value of the benchmark currency basket against US dollar

Ho's procedure allows effective exchange rate indices to be easily compiled for any country.
