= New Zealand wool boom =

1951 economic boom

New Zealand Wool Boom
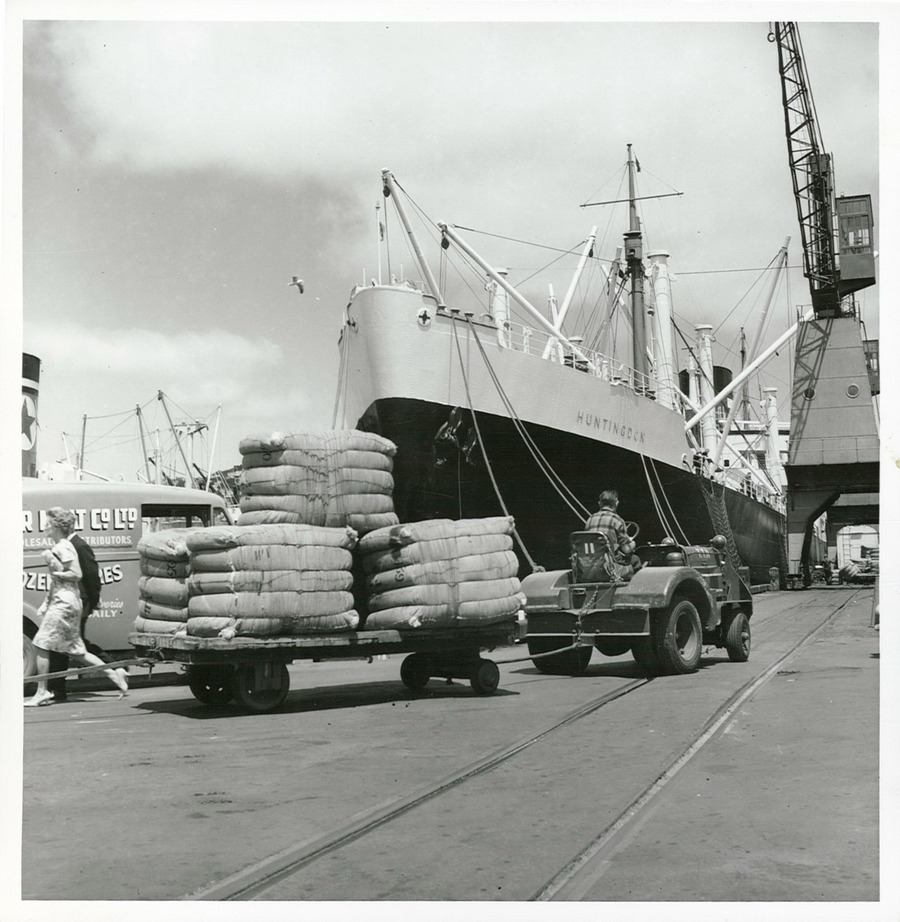
- A shipment of wool being loaded in Wellington, in the mid-1960s
- Duration: 1951 - 1960
- Type: Historic economic event
- Cause: Resulted from the 1950-1953 Korean War

The New Zealand wool boom of 1951, one of the greatest economic booms in the history of New Zealand, resulted directly from United States policy in the 1950–53 Korean War.

In 1950, when the Korean War broke out, the United States of America sought to buy large quantities of wool to complete its strategic stockpiles. This led to the greatest wool boom in New Zealand's history, with prices tripling overnight. In 1951 New Zealand experienced economic growth never seen again since. The echoes of the boom reverberated into the late 1950s, by which time a record number of farms were in operation.

The export price of wool declined by 40% in 1966, however New Zealand's sheep population continued to rise. From a total of 34.8 million in 1951, sheep numbers rose dramatically to peak at 70.3 million in 1982. However the subsequent free-market reforms of the Fourth Labour Government (in office: 1984–1990), and the associated removal of agricultural subsidies saw numbers decline even quicker than they had risen. By 2004 the national flock had dropped to a total of 39.3 million, the lowest in 50 years.

Recent years have seen sheep numbers increase again for the first time since 1982. New Zealand's sheep population stood at 40.1 million as of June 2006.

== New Zealand’s economy in the 20th century ==
At the beginning of the 20th century, New Zealand's economy experienced remarkable growth rates. Their main exports included specialised primary commodities such as wool, meat, butter, and cheese. For the first half of the 20th century, these commodities made up over 90% of New Zealand's exports. Consequently, New Zealand topped had the highest GDP per capita in the world, and had the second highest GDP per capita throughout the mid-20th century.

However, in the early 1930s, New Zealand experienced a great economic collapse. This led to staggering unemployment rates and resulted in a struggling economy. People were desperate to receive help from the state and government as many who had lost their jobs needed financial support to feed their families. Eventually, the government decided to reform the state policies. This saw an increase in state-funded sectors such as construction and manufacturing. From the 1940s to the 1970s, the percentage of New Zealand workers employed in the industrial sector increased to 35-40 per cent of the labour force. In the 1920s, less than 25 per cent of the labour force were working in this sector. The government also made various adjustments to their fiscal and monetary policies. The state intervention and support from the first Labour government was deemed effective and helped the economy to revive. The economy experienced a remarkably fast recovery. From 1934 to 1944, New Zealand recorded annual GDP growth rates of 7.5 per cent and GDP per capita rates of 6.7 per cent. These policies were carried through towards the mid-1990s and sustained New Zealand's economy. The policies were also deemed effective as they targeted full employment. The significant inflow of income due to the wool boom following the Korean War also served New Zealand's economy well.

The wool boom was attributed to the state's investment in pasture developments, which included funding, support, and lower taxes. This provided stability for New Zealand's economy as well as increased chances of securing economic and political relations with other countries in the longer term. During this time, the New Zealand government also did not have significant foreign debt. This is considered to have benefited their growth. Moreover, in 1949, New Zealand sheep farmers also started to experiment with applying fertilisers to the ground via drone and aeroplane methods。This saw a significant increase in land productivity across the country. Pasture production thus benefited from this. Wool prices began to decline in 1966/67.

In the 1980s, New Zealand was one of the only economies in the world that still had its exports dominated mostly by primary commodities. Though there was increased industrialisation, the manufacturing sector remained primarily for domestic production. However, following the reformation of state policies by the fourth Labour government, the economy itself fell into a relatively unstable condition. New Zealand's economy was facing soaring unemployment rates and significant reductions in profits, especially in the export market. The government was also facing rising foreign debt which added further stress to their economic system.

== New Zealand’s intervention in the Korean War ==
The Korean War was the fourth time New Zealand sent off their army troops to assist with conflicts overseas. The Korean War was considered the least significant conflict event for New Zealand and is often referred to as the ‘forgotten war’. The most significant aspect of the Korean War was the positive economic benefits brought by the great boost in wool prices.

Previously, New Zealand had no economic or political relations with Korea, nor did they have any intentions of strengthening ties with each other. It is believed that the first encounter of the New Zealand and Korean armies was during the Second World War. However, the New Zealand Army had reported that Korean guards had treated the prisoners of war poorly. Despite the short history between the two countries, New Zealand decided to get involved after the United States raised the issue of the Korean conflict to the United Nations (UN). Moreover, it is suggested that New Zealand wanted to take this opportunity to strengthen ties with the US, and to secure cooperation in hopes to strengthen New Zealand’s national security. It was further understood that the conflict in Korea saw New Zealand realise the need to restructure its political and economic ties with Great Britain. This was because, the heightened state of the Cold War, as well as the Korean War, became a significant indicator that New Zealand could not continue to rely on Britain for their political, economic, and national stability. Moreover, in the following year, both the Australian and New Zealand governments signed the ANZUS defence treaty. It was believed that this helped them to justify their open policies targeted to economic growth through state support.

== Significance of New Zealand's wool industry ==
Since the 1850s, sheep farming has been New Zealand’s most significant and important agricultural industry. Since the mid-1880s, New Zealand’s wool industry dominated most of the agricultural earnings for over a century. Sheep farming was first introduced to New Zealand by Captain James Cook back in 1773. The development of sheep farming took place towards the eastern region of the South Island. This area had prime natural features such as good rainfall, adequate land space and fertile soils. In the 20th century, New Zealand’s sheep were mostly used to produce meat to export into the British market, with wool also a secondary product demanded by the British. The sheep industry hit a peak during the wool boom and post Second World War after all New Zealand’s meat and wool were exported to Britain. However, in the 1970s, New Zealand sheep numbers started to decline. Wool prices plummeted for reasons including the 1970 ‘oil shock’ and the decline in government and state support. Sheep farmers had to adapt and respond to the changes brought by the global economy and natural variations in the climate.

Compared to Australian wool, New Zealand wool are thicker and coarser due to the climate, topography, and land availability. This makes New Zealand wool preferable for products such as carpets and blankets. On the other hand, Australian wool is generally used to produce apparel goods. The primary difference between Australian and New Zealand wool is related to fibre diameter, fibre length and vegetable matter.

== New Zealand’s wool in the 21st century (Post Wool-Boom) ==
50 years on from the Korean War wool boom, sheep numbers have decreased by more than half since the 1980s. As of June 2020, New Zealand recorded its lowest number of sheep of the decade. There were roughly 26.16 million sheep in 2020, compared to 32.56 million in 2010. Out of the 26.16 million sheep in New Zealand, only 5% are the merino sheep breed. Moreover, compared to meat production, only a small number of sheep are used for wool. The wool industry has been in decline ever since the wool boom. This decline has been partly attributed to the rising competitiveness of plastic and synthetics which offer consumers a cheaper price compared to wool. Numerous farmers in New Zealand have reported the struggle of selling wool at a decent price. They are running a deficit almost year-on-year, as costs are exceeding profits. Some farmers have also mentioned that wool prices have plummeted so significantly that they have been unable to sell out their wool and have them stockpiled in their barns. Another major reason for the decline of sheep numbers has been due to the lack of available land for sheep production as the demand for land used for other purposes such as dairy farming, horticulture farming and building human settlements have increased significantly. It is reported that dairying has replaced sheep farming as the dominant production in New Zealand in 2020.

However, it is predicted that some of the wool growing areas within New Zealand will likely experience an increase in the amount of wool fibre in the coming years towards 2030 due to the wool breeding areas exposed to the positive impacts of climate change. The wool growing areas of New Zealand’s west is predicted to observe increased rainfall and rising minimum temperatures. This will have positive impacts on the wool growing markets due to more water available for pasture production and maintaining livestock. On the other hand, traditional wool growing areas towards the east are expected to have decreasing rainfall availability. This will have significant implications for both the quality and quantity of wool production.

== See also ==
- Agriculture in New Zealand
- Economy of New Zealand
- Patagonian sheep farming boom
