= Trade-weighted effective exchange rate index =

The trade-weighted index for the Australian dollar, quarterly since 1970

The trade-weighted effective exchange rate index, a common form of the effective exchange rate index, is a multilateral exchange rate index. It is compiled as a weighted average of exchange rates of home versus foreign currencies, with the weight for each foreign country equal to its share in trade. Depending on the purpose for which it is used, it can be export-weighted, import-weighted, or total-external trade weighted.

== Overview ==
The trade-weighted effective exchange rate index is an economic indicator for comparing the exchange rate of a country against those of their major trading partners. By design, movements in the currencies of those trading partners with a greater share in an economy's exports and imports will have a greater effect on the effective exchange rate. In a multilateral, highly globalized, world, the effective exchange rate index is much more useful than a bilateral exchange rate, such as that between the Australian dollar and the United States dollar, for assessing changes in the competitiveness due to exchange rate movements.

== Weighting ==
Generally, the weighting method is geometric weighting rather than arithmetic weighting, referred as weighted geometric mean. The use of trade weights in a globalized economy is potentially misleading, because the amount of value added content in exports destined for a country may deviate significantly from the gross value of exports shipped to that country. See the entry under effective exchange rate index for an alternative approach to compiling an effective exchange rate index.

== Interpretation ==
The interpretation of the effective exchange rate is that if the index rises, other things being equal, the purchasing power of that currency also rises (the currency strengthened against those of the country's or area's trading partners). That will reduce the cost of imports but will undermine the competitiveness of exports. Other things refer, in particular, to the relative inflation rates of the economy as compared to the inflation rates of its trading partners. To account for all effects of relative inflation rates, the real effective exchange rate index is compiled as the product of the effective exchange rate index and the relative price index between the home economy and the trading partners.

== See also ==
- Aruoba-Diebold-Scotti Index
