= Fréchet mean =

Generalization of centroids to metric spaces

In mathematics and statistics, the Fréchet mean is a generalization of centroids to metric spaces, giving a single representative point or central tendency for a cluster of points. It is named after Maurice Fréchet. Karcher mean is the renaming of the Riemannian Center of Mass construction developed by Karsten Grove and Hermann Karcher. On the real numbers, the arithmetic mean, median, geometric mean, and harmonic mean can all be interpreted as Fréchet means for different distance functions.

== Definition ==
Let (M, d) be a complete metric space. Let x_{1}, x_{2}, …, x_{N} be points in M. For any point p in M, define the Fréchet variance to be the sum of squared distances from p to the x_{i}:

$$\Psi(p) = \sum_{i=1}^N d^2(p, x_i)$$

The Karcher means are then those points, m of M, which minimise $\Psi$:

$$m = \mathop{\text{arg min}}_{p \in M} \sum_{i=1}^N d^2(p, x_i)$$

If there is a unique m of M that strictly minimises $\Psi$, then it is Fréchet mean.

== Examples of Fréchet means ==
=== Arithmetic mean and median ===
For real numbers, the arithmetic mean is a Fréchet mean, using the usual Euclidean distance as the distance function.

The median is also a Fréchet mean, if the definition of the function Ψ is generalized to the non-quadratic

$$\Psi(p) = \sum_{i=1}^N d^\alpha(p, x_i),$$

where $\alpha=1$, and the Euclidean distance is the distance function d. In higher-dimensional spaces, this becomes the geometric median.

=== Geometric mean ===
On the positive real numbers, the (hyperbolic) distance function $d(x,y)= | \log(x) - \log(y) |$ can be defined. The geometric mean is the corresponding Fréchet mean. Indeed $f:x\mapsto e^x$ is then an isometry from the euclidean space to this "hyperbolic" space and must respect the Fréchet mean: the Fréchet mean of the $x_i$ is the image by $f$ of the Fréchet mean (in the Euclidean sense) of the $f^{-1}(x_i)$, i.e. it must be:

$$f\left( \frac{1}{n}\sum_{i=1}^n f^{-1}(x_i)\right) = \exp \left( \frac{1}{n} \sum_{i=1}^n\log x_i \right) = \sqrt[n]{x_1 \cdots x_n}$$.

=== Harmonic mean ===
On the positive real numbers, the metric (distance function):

$$d_\operatorname{H}(x,y) = \left| \frac{1}{x} - \frac{1}{y} \right|$$

can be defined. The harmonic mean is the corresponding Fréchet mean.

=== Power means ===
Given a non-zero real number $m$, the power mean can be obtained as a Fréchet mean by introducing the metric

$$d_m(x, y) = \left| x^m - y^m \right|$$

=== f-mean ===
Given an invertible and continuous function $f$, the f-mean can be defined as the Fréchet mean obtained by using the metric:

$$d_f(x,y) = \left|f(x) - f(y)\right|$$

This is sometimes called the generalised f-mean or quasi-arithmetic mean.

=== Weighted means ===
The general definition of the Fréchet mean (which includes the possibility of weighting observations) can be used to derive weighted versions for all of the above types of means.

For the arithmetic mean, the x_{i} are assigned weights w_{i}. Then, the Fréchet variances and the Fréchet mean are defined as:

$$\Psi(p) = \sum_{i=1}^N w_i\, d^2(p, x_i), \;\;\;\; m = \mathop{\text{arg min}}_{p \in M} \sum_{i=1}^N w_i d^2(p, x_i).$$

== See also ==
- Circular mean
- Fréchet distance
- M-estimator
- Geometric median
