= Pythagorean means =

Classical averages studied in ancient Greece

A geometric construction of the quadratic mean and the Pythagorean means (of two numbers a and b). Harmonic mean denoted by H, geometric by G, arithmetic by A and quadratic mean (also known as root mean square) denoted by Q.

Comparison of the arithmetic, geometric and harmonic means of a pair of numbers. The vertical dashed lines are asymptotes for the harmonic means.

In mathematics, the three classical Pythagorean means are the arithmetic mean (AM), the geometric mean (GM), and the harmonic mean (HM). These means were studied with proportions by Pythagoreans and later generations of Greek mathematicians because of their importance in geometry and music. They can now be regarded as special cases of a family of functions appropriately called the generalized means.

== Definition ==
The three Pythagorean means are defined by the equations
$$\begin{align}
\operatorname{AM} \left( x_1,\; \ldots,\; x_n \right) &= \frac{ x_1 + \;\cdots\; + x_n }{n}, \\[9pt]
\operatorname{GM} \left( x_1,\; \ldots,\; x_n \right) &= \sqrt[n]{\left\vert x_1 \times \,\cdots\, \times x_n \right\vert}, \text{ and} \\[9pt]
\operatorname{HM} \left( x_1,\; \ldots,\; x_n \right) &= \frac{n}{\displaystyle \frac{1}{x_1} + \;\cdots\; + \frac{1}{x_n}} .
\end{align}$$

== Properties ==
Each mean, $\operatorname{M}$, has the following properties for positive real inputs:

First-order homogeneity
$$\operatorname{M}(bx_1, \ldots, bx_n) = b \operatorname{M}(x_1, \ldots, x_n)$$
This ensures the physical value of the mean must be the same, for any choice of a ratio-scale for its units.
Invariance under exchange
$$\operatorname{M}(\ldots, x_i, \ldots, x_j, \ldots) = \operatorname{M}(\ldots,  x_j, \ldots, x_i, \ldots)$$
for any $i$ and $j$. This ensures that the mean is a symmetric function whose value does not depend upon the order of its arguments.
Monotonicity
if $a \leq b$ then $\operatorname{M}(a,x_1,x_2,\ldots x_n) \leq \operatorname{M}(b,x_1,x_2,\ldots x_n)$
Idempotence
$M(x,x,\ldots x) = x$ for all $x$

Monotonicity and idempotence together imply that a mean always lies between the extremes of the arguments:
$$\min(x_1, \ldots, x_n) \leq \operatorname{M}(x_1, \ldots, x_n) \leq \max(x_1, \ldots, x_n).$$

The harmonic and arithmetic means are reciprocal duals of each other for positive arguments,
$$\operatorname{HM}\left(\frac{1}{x_1}, \ldots, \frac{1}{x_n}\right) = \frac{1}{\operatorname{AM}\left(x_1, \ldots, x_n\right)},$$
while the geometric mean is its own reciprocal dual:
$$\operatorname{GM}\left(\frac{1}{x_1}, \ldots, \frac{1}{x_n}\right) = \frac{1}{\operatorname{GM}\left(x_1, \ldots, x_n\right)}.$$

== Inequalities among means ==
Geometric proof without words that max (a,b) > root mean square (RMS) or quadratic mean (QM) > arithmetic mean (AM) > geometric mean (GM) > harmonic mean (HM) > min (a,b) of two distinct positive numbers a and b (Note: If NM = a and PM = b. AM = AM of a and b, and radius r = AQ = AG. Using Pythagoras' theorem, QM² = AQ² + AM² ∴ QM = √A̅Q̅²̅ + A̅M̅²̅ = QM. Using Pythagoras' theorem, AM² = AG² + GM² ∴ GM = √A̅M̅²̅ − A̅G̅²̅ = GM. Using similar triangles, HM/GM = GM/AM ∴ HM = GM²/AM = HM.)

There is an ordering to these means (if all of the $x_i$ are positive)
$$\min \leq \operatorname{HM} \leq \operatorname{GM} \leq \operatorname{AM} \leq \max$$
with equality holding if and only if the $x_i$ are all equal.

This is a generalization of the inequality of arithmetic and geometric means and a special case of an inequality for generalized means. The proof follows from the arithmetic–geometric mean inequality, $\operatorname{AM} \leq \max$, and reciprocal duality ($\min$ and $\max$ are also reciprocal dual to each other).

The study of the Pythagorean means is closely related to the study of majorization and Schur-convex functions. The harmonic and geometric means are concave symmetric functions of their arguments, and hence Schur-concave, while the arithmetic mean is a linear function of its arguments and hence is both concave and convex.

== History ==
Almost everything that we know about the Pythagorean means came from arithmetic handbooks written in the first and second century. Nicomachus of Gerasa says that they were "acknowledged by all the ancients, Pythagoras, Plato and Aristotle." Their earliest known use is a fragment of the Pythagorean philosopher Archytas of Tarentum:

There are three means in music: one is arithmetic, second is the geometric, third is sub-contrary, which they call harmonic. The mean is arithmetic when three terms are in proportion such that the excess by which the first exceeds the second is that by which the second exceeds the third. In this proportion it turns out that the interval of the greater terms is less, but that of the lesser terms greater. The mean is the geometric when they are such that as the first is to the second, so the second is to the third. Of these terms the greater and the lesser have the interval between them equal. Subcontrary, which we call harmonic, is the mean when they are such that, by whatever part of itself the first term exceeds the second, by that part of the third the middle term exceeds the third. It turns out that in this proportion the interval between the greater terms is greater and that between the lesser terms is less.

— Archytas of Tarentum,

The name "harmonic mean", according to Iamblichus, was coined by Archytas and Hippasus. The Pythagorean means also appear in Plato's Timaeus. Another evidence of their early use is a commentary by Pappus.

It was [...] Theaetetus who distinguished the powers which are commensurable in length from those which are incommensurable, and who divided the more generally known irrational lines according to the different means, assigning the medial lines to geometry, the binomial to arithmetic, and the apotome to harmony, as is stated by Eudemus, the Peripatetic.

The term "mean" (Ancient Greek μεσότης, mesótēs) appears in the Neopythagorean arithmetic handbooks in connection with the term "proportion" (Ancient Greek ἀναλογία, analogía).

== Smallest distinct positive integer means ==
Smallest distinct positive integer means
a	b	HM	GM	AM
5	45	9	15	25
10	40	16	20	25

Nomograms to graphically calculate arithmetic (1), geometric (2) and harmonic (3) means, z of x=40 and y=10 (red), and x=45 and y=5 (blue)

Of all pairs of different natural numbers of the form (a, b) such that a < b, the smallest (as defined by least value of a + b) for which the arithmetic, geometric and harmonic means are all also natural numbers are (5, 45) and (10, 40).

For the pair of natural numbers, the arithmetic mean is a natural number when the sum is even. However, the mean is not a natural number when the sum is odd.

For the pair of natural numbers, the geometric mean is rational, esp. a natural number, when the product is a perfect square, esp. a natural perfect square number. However, the mean is irrational when the product is not a perfect square, esp. when the product is not a natural perfect square number.

For the pair of natural numbers, the harmonic mean is a natural number when twice the product is divisible by the sum. However, the mean is not a natural number when twice the product is not divisible by the sum.

== See also ==
- Arithmetic–geometric mean
- Average
- Golden ratio
- Kepler triangle
- QM-AM-GM-HM inequalities
