= Weighted average =

Statistical amount

Weighted average is a single number or value that best represents a set of data, when each data point is assigned different "weights" or importance. The most common weighted average is the weighted arithmetic mean, which is similar to an ordinary arithmetic mean except some data points contribute more than others. Other cases include the weighted geometric mean and Weighted harmonic mean.
