= Log semiring =

Semiring arising in tropical analysis

In mathematics, in the field of tropical analysis, the log-semiring is the semiring structure on the logarithmic scale, obtained by considering the extended real numbers as logarithms. That is, the operations of addition and multiplication are defined by conjugation: exponentiate the real numbers, obtaining a positive (or zero) number, add or multiply these numbers with the ordinary algebraic operations on real numbers, and then take the logarithm to reverse the initial exponentiation. Such operations are also known as, e.g., logarithmic addition, etc. As usual in tropical analysis, the operations are denoted by ⊕ and ⊗ to distinguish them from the usual addition + and multiplication × (or ⋅). These operations depend on the choice of base b for the exponent and logarithm (b is a choice of logarithmic unit), which corresponds to a scale factor, and are well-defined for any positive base other than 1; using a base b < 1 is equivalent to using a negative sign and using the inverse 1/b > 1. (Note: Since $b^{-x} = \left(b^{-1}\right)^x=(1/b)^x$) If not qualified, the base is conventionally taken to be e or 1/e, which corresponds to e with a negative.

The log-semiring has the tropical semiring as limit ("tropicalization", "dequantization") as the base goes to infinity $b \to \infty$ (max-plus semiring) or to zero $b \to 0$ (min-plus semiring), and thus can be viewed as a deformation ("quantization") of the tropical semiring. Notably, the addition operation, logadd (for multiple terms, LogSumExp) can be viewed as a deformation of maximum or minimum. The log-semiring has applications in mathematical optimization, since it replaces the non-smooth maximum and minimum by a smooth operation. The log-semiring also arises when working with numbers that are logarithms (measured on a logarithmic scale), such as decibels (see Decibel § Addition), log probability, or log-likelihoods.

== Definition ==
The operations on the log-semiring can be defined extrinsically by mapping them to the non-negative real numbers, doing the operations there, and mapping them back. The non-negative real numbers with the usual operations of addition and multiplication form a semiring (there are no negatives), known as the probability semiring, so the log-semiring operations can be viewed as pullbacks of the operations on the probability semiring, and these are isomorphic as rings.

Formally, given the extended real numbers R ∪ {–∞, +∞} (Note: Usually only one infinity is included, not both, since $\infty \otimes -\infty = \infty + (-\infty)$ is ambiguous, and is best left undefined, as is 0/0 in real numbers.) and a positive base b ≠ 1, one defines:

$$\begin{align}
x \oplus_b y  &= \log_b\left(b^x + b^y\right) \\
x \otimes_b y &= \log_b\left(b^x \times b^y\right) = \log_b\left(b^{x+y}\right) = x + y.
\end{align}$$

Regardless of base, log-multiplication is the same as usual addition, $x \otimes_b y = x + y$, since logarithms take multiplication to addition; however, log-addition depends on base. The units for usual addition and multiplication are 0 and 1; accordingly, the unit for log-addition is $\log_b 0 = -\infty$ for $b > 1$ and $\log_b 0 = -\log_{1/b} 0 = +\infty$ for $b < 1$, and the unit for log-multiplication is $\log 1 = 0$, regardless of base.

More concisely, the unit log-semiring can be defined with the base e as:

$$\begin{align}
x \oplus y  &= \log\left(e^x + e^y\right) \\
x \otimes y &= x + y.
\end{align}$$

with additive unit −∞ and multiplicative unit 0; this corresponds to the max convention.

The opposite convention is also common, and corresponds to the base 1/e, the minimum convention:

$$\begin{align}
x \oplus y  &= -\log\left(e^{-x} + e^{-y}\right) \\
x \otimes y &= x + y.
\end{align}$$

with additive unit +∞ and multiplicative unit 0.

== Properties ==
A log-semiring is in fact a semifield, since all numbers other than the additive unit −∞ (or +∞) have a multiplicative inverse, given by $-x,$ since $x \otimes -x = \log_b(b^x \cdot b^{-x}) = \log_b (1) = 0.$ Thus, log-division ⊘ is well-defined, though log-subtraction ⊖ is not always defined.

A mean can be defined by log-addition and log-division (as the quasi-arithmetic mean corresponding to the exponent), as

$$M_\mathrm{lm}(x, y) := (x \oplus y) \oslash 2 = \log_b\bigl((b^x + b^y)/2\bigr) = \log_b (b^x + b^y) - \log_b 2 = (x \oplus y) - \log_b 2.$$

This is just addition shifted by $- \log_b 2,$ since log-division corresponds to linear subtraction.

A log-semiring has the usual Euclidean metric, which corresponds to the logarithmic scale on the positive real numbers.

Similarly, a log-semiring has the usual Lebesgue measure, which is an invariant measure with respect to log-multiplication (usual addition, geometrically translation) which corresponds to the logarithmic measure on the probability semiring.

== See also ==
- Logarithmic mean
- LogSumExp
- Softmax
