= Weighted statistics =

In statistics, there are many applications of "weighting":

- Weighted mean
- Weighted harmonic mean
- Weighted geometric mean
- Weighted least squares
