= Generalized mean =

N-th root of the arithmetic mean of the given numbers raised to the power n

Plot of several generalized means $M_p(1, x)$

In mathematics, generalized means (or power mean or Hölder mean from Otto Hölder) are a family of functions for aggregating sets of numbers. These include as special cases the Pythagorean means (arithmetic, geometric, and harmonic means).

== Definition ==
If p is a non-zero real number, and $x_1, \dots, x_n$ are positive real numbers, then the generalized mean or power mean with exponent p of these positive real numbers is

$$M_p(x_1,\dots,x_n) = \left( \frac{1}{n} \sum_{i=1}^n x_i^p \right)^{{1}/{p}} .$$

(See p-norm). For p = 0 we set it equal to the geometric mean (which is the limit of means with exponents approaching zero, as proved below):

$$M_0(x_1, \dots, x_n) = \left(\prod_{i=1}^n x_i\right)^{1/n} .$$

Furthermore, for a sequence of positive weights w_{i} we define the weighted power mean as
$$M_p(x_1,\dots,x_n) = \left(\frac{\sum_{i=1}^n w_i x_i^p}{\sum_{i=1}^n w_i} \right)^{{1}/{p}}$$
and when p = 0, it is equal to the weighted geometric mean:

$$M_0(x_1,\dots,x_n) = \left(\prod_{i=1}^n x_i^{w_i}\right)^{1 / \sum_{i=1}^n w_i} .$$

The unweighted means correspond to setting all w_{i} = 1.

== Special cases ==
For some values of $p$, the mean $M_p(x_1, \dots, x_n)$ corresponds to a well known mean.

A visual depiction of some of the specified cases for $n = 2$. Harmonic mean: $M_{-1}(a, b)$. Geometric mean: $M_0(a, b)$. Arithmetic mean: $M_1(a, b)$. Quadratic mean: $M_2(a, b)$.

Name	Exponent	Value
Minimum	$p = -\infty$	$\min \{x_1, \dots, x_n\}$
Harmonic mean	$p = -1$	$\frac{n}{\frac{1}{x_1}+\dots+\frac{1}{x_n}}$
Geometric mean	$p = 0$	$\sqrt[n]{x_1\dots x_n}$
Arithmetic mean	$p = 1$	$\frac{x_1 + \dots + x_n}{n}$
Root mean square	$p = 2$	$\sqrt{\frac{x_1^2 + \dots + x_n^2}{n}}$
Cubic mean	$p = 3$	$\sqrt[3]{\frac{x_1^3 + \dots + x_n^3}{n}}$
Maximum	$p = +\infty$	$\max\{x_1, \dots, x_n\}$

Proof of $\lim_{p \to 0} M_p = M_0$ (geometric mean)

For the purpose of the proof, we will assume without loss of generality that
$$w_i \in [0,1]$$
and
$$\sum_{i=1}^n w_i = 1.$$

We can rewrite the definition of $M_p$ using the exponential function as

$$M_p(x_1,\dots,x_n) = \exp{\left( \ln{\left[\left(\sum_{i=1}^n w_ix_{i}^p \right)^{1/p}\right]} \right) } = \exp{\left( \frac{\ln{\left(\sum_{i=1}^n w_ix_{i}^p \right)}}{p} \right) }$$

In the limit p → 0, we can apply L'Hôpital's rule to the argument of the exponential function. We assume that $p \isin \mathbb{R}$ but p ≠ 0, and that the sum of w_{i} is equal to 1 (without loss in generality); differentiating the numerator and denominator with respect to p, we have
$$\begin{align}
\lim_{p \to 0} \frac{\ln{\left(\sum_{i=1}^n w_ix_{i}^p \right)}}{p} &= \lim_{p \to 0} \frac{\frac{\sum_{i=1}^n w_i x_i^p \ln{x_i}}{\sum_{j=1}^n w_j x_j^p}}{1} \\
&= \lim_{p \to 0} \frac{\sum_{i=1}^n w_i x_i^p \ln{x_i}}{\sum_{j=1}^n w_j x_j^p} \\
&= \frac{\sum_{i=1}^n w_i \ln{x_i}}{\sum_{j=1}^n w_j} \\
&= \sum_{i=1}^n w_i \ln{x_i} \\
&= \ln{\left(\prod_{i=1}^n x_i^{w_i} \right)}
\end{align}$$

By the continuity of the exponential function, we can substitute back into the above relation to obtain
$$\lim_{p \to 0} M_p(x_1,\dots,x_n) = \exp{\left( \ln{\left(\prod_{i=1}^n x_i^{w_i} \right)} \right)} = \prod_{i=1}^n x_i^{w_i} = M_0(x_1,\dots,x_n)$$
as desired.

Proof of $\lim_{p \to \infty} M_p = M_\infty$ and $\lim_{p \to -\infty} M_p = M_{-\infty}$

Assume (possibly after relabeling and combining terms together) that $x_1 \geq \dots \geq x_n$. Then

$$\begin{align}
\lim_{p \to \infty} M_p(x_1,\dots,x_n) &= \lim_{p \to \infty} \left( \sum_{i=1}^n w_i x_i^p \right)^{1/p} \\
&= x_1 \lim_{p \to \infty} \left( \sum_{i=1}^n w_i \left( \frac{x_i}{x_1} \right)^p \right)^{1/p} \\
&= x_1 = M_\infty (x_1,\dots,x_n).
\end{align}$$

The formula for $M_{-\infty}$ follows from
$$M_{-\infty} (x_1,\dots,x_n) = \frac{1}{M_\infty (1/x_1,\dots,1/x_n)} = x_n.$$

== Properties ==
Let $x_1, \dots, x_n$ be a sequence of positive real numbers, then the following properties hold:

1. $\min(x_1, \dots, x_n) \le M_p(x_1, \dots, x_n) \le \max(x_1, \dots, x_n)$.
  Each generalized mean always lies between the smallest and largest of the x values.
2. $M_p(x_1, \dots, x_n) = M_p(P(x_1, \dots, x_n))$, where $P$ is a permutation operator.
  Each generalized mean is a symmetric function of its arguments; permuting the arguments of a generalized mean does not change its value.
3. $M_p(b x_1, \dots, b x_n) = b \cdot M_p(x_1, \dots, x_n)$.
  Like most means, the generalized mean is a homogeneous function of its arguments x_{1}, ..., x_{n}. That is, if b is a positive real number, then the generalized mean with exponent p of the numbers $b\cdot x_1,\dots, b\cdot x_n$ is equal to b times the generalized mean of the numbers x_{1}, ..., x_{n}.
4. $M_p(x_1, \dots, x_{n \cdot k}) = M_p\left[M_p(x_1, \dots, x_{k}), M_p(x_{k + 1}, \dots, x_{2 \cdot k}), \dots, M_p(x_{(n - 1) \cdot k + 1}, \dots, x_{n \cdot k})\right]$.
  Like the quasi-arithmetic means, the computation of the mean can be split into computations of equal sized sub-blocks. This enables use of a divide and conquer algorithm to calculate the means, when desirable.

=== Generalized mean inequality ===
Geometric proof without words that max (a,b) > root mean square (RMS) or quadratic mean (QM) > arithmetic mean (AM) > geometric mean (GM) > harmonic mean (HM) > min (a,b) of two distinct positive numbers a and b (Note: If NM = a and PM = b. AM = AM of a and b, and radius r = AQ = AG. Using Pythagoras' theorem, QM² = AQ² + AM² ∴ QM = √A̅Q̅²̅ + A̅M̅²̅ = QM. Using Pythagoras' theorem, AM² = AG² + GM² ∴ GM = √A̅M̅²̅ − A̅G̅²̅ = GM. Using similar triangles, HM/GM = GM/AM ∴ HM = GM²/AM = HM.)

In general, if p < q, then
$$M_p(x_1, \dots, x_n) \le M_q(x_1, \dots, x_n)$$
and the two means are equal if and only if x_{1} = x_{2} = ... = x_{n}.

The inequality is true for real values of p and q, as well as positive and negative infinity values.

It follows from the fact that, for all real p,
$$\frac{\partial}{\partial p}M_p(x_1, \dots, x_n) \geq 0$$
which can be proved using Jensen's inequality.

In particular, for p in {−1, 0, 1}, the generalized mean inequality implies the Pythagorean means inequality as well as the inequality of arithmetic and geometric means.

== Proof of the weighted inequality ==
We will prove the weighted power mean inequality. For the purpose of the proof we will assume the following without loss of generality:
$$\begin{align}
w_i \in [0, 1] \\
\sum_{i=1}^nw_i = 1
\end{align}$$

The proof for unweighted power means can be easily obtained by substituting w_{i} = 1/n.

=== Equivalence of inequalities between means of opposite signs ===
Suppose an average between power means with exponents p and q holds:
$$\left(\sum_{i=1}^n w_i x_i^p\right)^{1/p} \geq \left(\sum_{i=1}^n w_i x_i^q\right)^{1/q}$$
applying this, then:
$$\left(\sum_{i=1}^n\frac{w_i}{x_i^p}\right)^{1/p} \geq \left(\sum_{i=1}^n\frac{w_i}{x_i^q}\right)^{1/q}$$

We raise both sides to the power of −1 (strictly decreasing function in positive reals):
$$\left(\sum_{i=1}^nw_ix_i^{-p}\right)^{-1/p}
= \left(\frac{1}{\sum_{i=1}^nw_i\frac{1}{x_i^p}}\right)^{1/p}
\leq \left(\frac{1}{\sum_{i=1}^nw_i\frac{1}{x_i^q}}\right)^{1/q}
= \left(\sum_{i=1}^nw_ix_i^{-q}\right)^{-1/q}$$

We get the inequality for means with exponents −p and −q, and we can use the same reasoning backwards, thus proving the inequalities to be equivalent, which will be used in some of the later proofs.

=== Geometric mean ===
For any q > 0 and non-negative weights summing to 1, the following inequality holds:
$$\left(\sum_{i=1}^n w_i x_i^{-q}\right)^{-1/q} \leq \prod_{i=1}^n x_i^{w_i} \leq \left(\sum_{i=1}^n w_i x_i^q\right)^{1/q}.$$

The proof follows from Jensen's inequality, making use of the fact the logarithm is concave:
$$\log \prod_{i=1}^n x_i^{w_i} = \sum_{i=1}^n w_i\log x_i \leq \log \sum_{i=1}^n w_i x_i.$$

By applying the exponential function to both sides and observing that as a strictly increasing function it preserves the sign of the inequality, we get
$$\prod_{i=1}^n x_i^{w_i} \leq \sum_{i=1}^n w_i x_i.$$

Taking q-th powers of the x_{i} yields
$$\begin{align}
&\prod_{i=1}^n x_i^{q{\cdot}w_i} \leq \sum_{i=1}^n w_i x_i^q \\
&\prod_{i=1}^n x_i^{w_i} \leq \left(\sum_{i=1}^n w_i x_i^q\right)^{1/q}.\end{align}$$

Thus, we are done for the inequality with positive q; the case for negatives is identical but for the swapped signs in the last step:

$$\prod_{i=1}^n x_i^{-q{\cdot}w_i} \leq \sum_{i=1}^n w_i x_i^{-q}.$$

Of course, taking each side to the power of a negative number -1/q swaps the direction of the inequality.

$$\prod_{i=1}^n x_i^{w_i} \geq \left(\sum_{i=1}^n w_i x_i^{-q}\right)^{-1/q}.$$

=== Inequality between any two power means ===
We are to prove that for any p < q the following inequality holds:
$$\left(\sum_{i=1}^n w_i x_i^p\right)^{1/p} \leq \left(\sum_{i=1}^nw_ix_i^q\right)^{1/q}$$
if p is negative, and q is positive, the inequality is equivalent to the one proved above:
$$\left(\sum_{i=1}^nw_i x_i^p\right)^{1/p} \leq \prod_{i=1}^n x_i^{w_i} \leq \left(\sum_{i=1}^n w_i x_i^q\right)^{1/q}$$

The proof for positive p and q is as follows: Define the following function: f : R_{+} → R_{+} $f(x)=x^{\frac{q}{p}}$. f is a power function, so it does have a second derivative:
$$f''(x) = \left(\frac{q}{p} \right) \left( \frac{q}{p}-1 \right)x^{\frac{q}{p}-2}$$
which is strictly positive within the domain of f, since q > p, so we know f is convex.

Using this, and the Jensen's inequality we get:
$$\begin{align}
f \left( \sum_{i=1}^nw_ix_i^p \right) &\leq \sum_{i=1}^nw_if(x_i^p) \\[3pt]
\left(\sum_{i=1}^n w_i x_i^p\right)^{q/p} &\leq \sum_{i=1}^nw_ix_i^q
\end{align}$$
after raising both side to the power of 1/q (an increasing function, since 1/q is positive) we get the inequality which was to be proven:

$$\left(\sum_{i=1}^n w_i x_i^p\right)^{1/p} \leq \left(\sum_{i=1}^n w_i x_i^q\right)^{1/q}$$

Using the previously shown equivalence we can prove the inequality for negative p and q by replacing them with −q and −p, respectively.

== Generalized f-mean ==
The power mean could be generalized further to the generalized f-mean:

$$M_f(x_1,\dots,x_n) = f^{-1} \left({\frac{1}{n}\cdot\sum_{i=1}^n{f(x_i)}}\right)$$

This covers the geometric mean without using a limit with f(x) = log(x). The power mean is obtained for f(x) = x^{p}. Properties of these means are studied in de Carvalho (2016).

== Applications ==
=== Signal processing ===
A power mean serves a non-linear moving average which is shifted towards small signal values for small p and emphasizes big signal values for big p. Given an efficient implementation of a moving arithmetic mean called smooth one can implement a moving power mean according to the following Haskell code.

powerSmooth :: Floating a => ([a] -> [a]) -> a -> [a] -> [a]
powerSmooth smooth p = map (** recip p) . smooth . map (**p)

- For big p it can serve as an envelope detector on a rectified signal.
- For small p it can serve as a baseline detector on a mass spectrum.

== See also ==
- Arithmetic–geometric mean
- Average
- Heronian mean
- Inequality of arithmetic and geometric means
- Lehmer mean – also a mean related to powers
- Minkowski distance
- Quasi-arithmetic mean – another name for the generalized f-mean mentioned above
- Root mean square
