= QM–AM–GM–HM inequalities =

Chain of inequalities of means of positive numbers

In mathematics, the QM–AM–GM–HM inequalities, also known as the mean inequality chain, state the relationship between the harmonic mean (HM), geometric mean (GM), arithmetic mean (AM), and quadratic mean (QM; also known as root mean square). Suppose that $x_1, x_2, \ldots, x_n$ are positive real numbers. Then

$$\frac{n}{\frac{1}{x_1}+\frac{1}{x_2}+\cdots+\frac{1}{x_n}}\leq\sqrt[n]{x_1x_2\cdots x_n}\leq\frac{x_1+x_2+\cdots+x_n}{n} \leq\sqrt{\frac{x_1^2+x_2^2+\cdots+x_n^2}{n}}.$$

In other words, HM ≤ GM ≤ AM ≤ QM. These inequalities often appear in mathematical competitions and have applications in many fields of science.

Here if $x_1\leqslant x_2\leqslant ....\leqslant x_n$, then

$x_1\leq \text{HM} \leq \text{GM} \leq \text{AM} \leq \text{QM} \leq x_n$

Equality holds when

$x_i = x_j \forall i,j \in \{1,2,...,n-1,n\}$

i.e. $x_1=x_2=...=x_n$

== Proof ==
There are three inequalities between means to prove. There are various methods to prove the inequalities, including mathematical induction, the Cauchy–Schwarz inequality, Lagrange multipliers, and Jensen's inequality. For several proofs that GM ≤ AM, see Inequality of arithmetic and geometric means.

=== AM–QM inequality ===
From the Cauchy–Schwarz inequality on real numbers, setting one vector to (1, 1, ...):

$\left( \sum_{i=1}^n x_i \cdot 1 \right)^{\! 2} \leq \left( \sum_{i=1}^n x_i^2 \right) \left( \sum_{i=1}^n 1^2 \right) = n \,\sum_{i=1}^n x_i^2,$ hence $\left( \frac{\sum_{i=1}^n x_i}{n} \right)^{\! 2} \leq \frac{\sum_{i=1}^n x_i^2}{n}$. For positive $x_i$ the square root of this gives the inequality.

=== AM–GM inequality ===
Jensen's inequality states that the value of a concave function of an arithmetic mean is greater than or equal to the arithmetic mean of the function's values. Since the logarithm function is concave, we have

$$\log  \left(\frac { \sum x_i}{n} \right) \geq  \frac{1}{n} \sum \log x_i  = \frac{1}{n} \log \left( \prod x_i\right) = \log \left( \left( \prod x_i \right) ^{1/n} \right).$$

Taking antilogs (the exponential) of the far left and far right sides, we have the AM–GM inequality.

=== HM–GM inequality ===
The reciprocal of the harmonic mean is the arithmetic mean of the reciprocals $1/x_1 , \dots, 1/x_n$, and it exceeds $1/\sqrt[n]{x_1 \dots x_n}$ by the AM-GM inequality. $x_i > 0$ implies the inequality:

$\frac{n}{\frac{1}{x_1} + \dots + \frac{1}{x_n}} \leq \sqrt[n]{x_1\dots x_n}.$

== The n = 2 case ==
Visualization of the inequalities inside of a semi-circle, with supporting equalities in grey, a = x_{1}, b = x_{2}.

When n = 2, the inequalities become

$\frac {2x_1 x_2}{x_1+x_2} \leq \sqrt{x_1 x_2} \leq \frac{x_1+x_2}{2}\leq\sqrt{\frac{x_1^2+x_2^2}{2}}$ for all $x_1, x_2 > 0,$

which can be visualized in a semi-circle whose diameter is x_{1}+x_{2}.

Suppose C is a point on [AB] and let AC = x_{1} and BC = x_{2}. Find the midpoint of [AB] as D and use as the center for the semi-circle from A to B. Construct perpendiculars to [AB] at D and C respectively, intersecting the circle at E and F respectively. Join [CE] and [DF] and further construct a perpendicular [CG] to [DF] at G. The length of DE is the arithmetic mean by the virtue of being the ray of the circle. CE can be calculated to be the quadratic mean from the Pythagorean theorem, CF to be the geometric mean from a combination of Thales's theorem (establishing that △ABF is a right triangle) and Geometric mean theorem, GF to be the harmonic mean from the similarity of triangle △CGF and △DCF (whose edge [DF]'s length can be calculated using the Pythagorean theorem and the two other known edges).

Comparison of harmonic, geometric, arithmetic, quadratic and other mean values of two positive real numbers $x_1$ and $x_2$
