= Average rectified value =

In electrical engineering, the average rectified value (ARV) of a quantity is its average absolute value. The ARV of an alternating current indicates which direct current would transport the same amount of electrical charge within the same period of time. On the other hand, the RMS current describes which direct current delivers the same amount of electrical power within the same time period as the alternating current.

The average of a symmetric alternating value is zero and it is therefore not useful to characterize it. Thus the easiest way to determine a quantitative measurement size is to use the average rectified value. The average rectified value is mainly used to characterize alternating voltage and current. It can be computed by averaging the absolute value of a waveform over one full period of the waveform.

While conceptually similar to the root mean square (RMS), ARV will differ from it whenever a function's absolute value varies locally, as the former then increases disproportionately. Their ratio is expressed by the form factor

$$k_{\mathrm{f}} = {\mathrm{RMS}\over\mathrm{ARV}}.$$

== See also ==
- Average absolute deviation
- Root mean square
- Form factor (electronics)
- True RMS converter
