= LogSumExp =

Smooth approximation to the maximum function

Graph of $\mathrm{LSE}(x,-x)$ compared to $\max(x,-x)$

The LogSumExp (LSE) (also called RealSoftMax or multivariable softplus) function is a smooth maximum – a smooth approximation to the maximum function, mainly used by machine learning algorithms. It is defined as the logarithm of the sum of the exponentials of the arguments:

$$\mathrm{LSE}(x_1, \dots, x_n) = \log\left( \exp(x_1) + \cdots + \exp(x_n) \right).$$

== Properties ==
The LogSumExp function domain is $\R^n$, the real coordinate space, and its codomain is $\R$, the real line. It is an approximation to the maximum $\max_i x_i$ with the following bounds
$$\max{\{x_1, \dots, x_n\}} \leq \mathrm{LSE}(x_1, \dots, x_n) \leq \max{\{x_1, \dots, x_n\}} + \log(n).$$
The first inequality is strict unless $n = 1$. The second inequality is strict unless all arguments are equal. (Proof: Let $m = \max_i x_i$. Then $\exp(m) \leq \sum_{i=1}^n \exp(x_i) \leq n \exp(m)$. Applying the logarithm to the inequality gives the result.)

In addition, we can scale the function to make the bounds tighter. Consider the function $\frac 1 t \mathrm{LSE}(tx_1, \dots, tx_n)$. Then
$$\max{\{x_1, \dots, x_n\}} < \frac 1 t \mathrm{LSE}(tx_1, \dots, tx_n) \leq \max{\{x_1, \dots, x_n\}} + \frac{\log(n)}{t}.$$
(Proof: Replace each $x_i$ with $tx_i$ for some $t>0$ in the inequalities above, to give
$$\max{\{tx_1, \dots, tx_n\}} < \mathrm{LSE}(tx_1, \dots, tx_n)\leq \max{\{tx_1, \dots, tx_n\}} + \log(n).$$
and, since $t>0$
$$t \max{\{x_1, \dots, x_n\}} < \mathrm{LSE}(tx_1, \dots, tx_n)\leq t\max{\{x_1, \dots, x_n\}} + \log(n).$$
finally, dividing by $t$ gives the result.)

Also, if we multiply by a negative number instead, we of course find a comparison to the $\min$ function:
$$\min{\{x_1, \dots, x_n\}} - \frac{\log(n)}{t} \leq \frac 1 {-t} \mathrm{LSE}(-tx) < \min{\{x_1, \dots, x_n\}}.$$

The LogSumExp function is convex, and is strictly increasing everywhere in its domain. It is not strictly convex, since it is affine (linear plus a constant) on the diagonal and parallel lines:

$$\mathrm{LSE}(x_1 + c, \dots, x_n + c) =\mathrm{LSE}(x_1, \dots, x_n) + c.$$

Other than this direction, it is strictly convex (the Hessian has rank $n - 1$), so for example restricting to a hyperplane that is transverse to the diagonal results in a strictly convex function. See $\mathrm{LSE}_0^+$, below.

Writing $\mathbf{x} = (x_1, \dots, x_n),$ the partial derivatives are:
$$\frac{\partial}{\partial x_i}{\mathrm{LSE}(\mathbf{x})} =
\frac{\exp x_i}{\sum_j \exp {x_j}},$$
which means the gradient of LogSumExp is the softmax function.

The convex conjugate of LogSumExp is the negative entropy.

In tropical analysis, LogSumExp is the sum in the log semiring.

== log-sum-exp trick for log-domain calculations ==
The LSE function is often encountered when the usual arithmetic computations are performed on a logarithmic scale, as in log probability.

Similar to multiplication operations in linear-scale becoming simple additions in log-scale, an addition operation in linear-scale becomes the LSE in log-scale:

$$\mathrm{LSE}(\log(x_1), ..., \log(x_n)) = \log(x_1 + \dots + x_n)$$
A common purpose of using log-domain computations is to increase accuracy and avoid underflow and overflow problems when very small or very large numbers are represented directly (i.e. in a linear domain) using limited-precision floating point numbers.

Unfortunately, the use of LSE directly in this case can again cause overflow/underflow problems. Therefore, the following equivalent must be used instead (especially when the accuracy of the above 'max' approximation is not sufficient).

$$\mathrm{LSE}(x_1, \dots, x_n) = x^* + \log\left( \exp(x_1-x^*)+ \cdots + \exp(x_n-x^*) \right)$$
where $x^* = \max{\{x_1, \dots, x_n\}}$

Many math libraries such as IT++ provide a default routine of LSE and use this formula internally.

== A strictly convex log-sum-exp type function ==
LSE is convex but not strictly convex. We can define a strictly convex log-sum-exp type function by adding an extra argument set to zero:

$$\mathrm{LSE}_0^+(x_1,...,x_n) = \mathrm{LSE}(0,x_1,...,x_n)$$
This function is a proper Bregman generator (strictly convex and differentiable). It is encountered in machine learning, for example, as the cumulant of the multinomial/binomial family.

== See also ==
- Logarithmic mean
- Log semiring
- Smooth maximum
- Softmax function
