= Softmax function =

Smooth approximation of one-hot arg max

The softmax function, also known as softargmax or normalized exponential function, converts a tuple of K real numbers into a probability distribution over K possible outcomes. It is a generalization of the logistic function to multiple dimensions and is used in multinomial logistic regression. The softmax function is often used as the last activation function of a neural network to normalize the output of a network to a probability distribution over predicted output classes.

== Definition ==
The softmax function takes as input a tuple z of K real numbers and normalizes it into a probability distribution consisting of K probabilities proportional to the exponentials of the input numbers. That is, prior to applying softmax, some tuple components could be negative, or greater than one, and might not sum to 1; but after applying softmax, each component will be in the interval $(0, 1)$, and the components will add up to 1, so that they can be interpreted as probabilities. Furthermore, the larger input components will correspond to larger probabilities. In the degenerate case of K = 1, the sole component will always be exactly equal to 1.

2-dimensional softmax as function of $y - x$

Formally, the standard (unit) softmax function $\sigma: \R^K \to (0, 1)^K$, where $K > 1$, takes a tuple $\mathbf{z} = (z_1, \dotsc, z_K) \in \R^K$ and computes each component of vector $\sigma(\mathbf{z}) \in (0, 1)^K$ with
$$\sigma(\mathbf{z})_i = \frac{e^{z_i}}{\sum_{j=1}^K e^{z_j}}.$$
In words, the softmax applies the standard exponential function to each element $z_i$ of the input tuple $\mathbf z$ (consisting of $K$ real numbers) and normalizes these values by dividing by the sum of all these exponentials. The normalization ensures that the sum of the components of the output vector $\sigma(\mathbf z)$ is 1. The term "softmax" derives from the amplifying effects of the exponential on any maxima in the input tuple. For example, the standard softmax of $(1, 2, 8)$ is approximately $(0.001, 0.002, 0.997)$, which amounts to assigning almost all of the total unit weight in the result to the position of the tuple's maximal element (of 8).

In general, instead of e, a different base b > 0 can be used. As above, if b > 1, then larger input components will result in larger output probabilities, and increasing the value of b will create probability distributions that are more concentrated around the positions of the largest input values. Conversely, if 0 < b < 1, then smaller input components will result in larger output probabilities, and decreasing the value of b will create probability distributions that are more concentrated around the positions of the smallest input values. Writing $b = e^\beta$ or $b = e^{-\beta}$ (Note: Positive β corresponds to the maximum convention and is usual in machine learning, corresponding to the highest score having highest probability. The negative −β corresponds to the minimum convention and is conventional in thermodynamics, corresponding to the lowest-energy state having the highest probability; this matches the convention in the Gibbs distribution, interpreting β as coldness.) (for real β) (Note: The notation β is for the thermodynamic beta, which is inverse temperature: $\beta = 1/T$, $T = 1/\beta.$) yields the expressions (Note: For $\beta = 0$ (coldness zero, infinite temperature), $b = e^\beta = e^0 = 1$, and this becomes the constant function $(1/n, \dots, 1/n)$, corresponding to the discrete uniform distribution.)
$$\sigma(\mathbf{z})_i = \frac{e^{\beta z_i}}{\sum_{j=1}^K e^{\beta z_j}}
\quad \text{or} \quad
\sigma(\mathbf{z})_i = \frac{e^{-\beta z_i}}{\sum_{j=1}^K e^{-\beta z_j}}
\quad \text{for}\ i = 1, \dots, K.$$

A value proportional to the reciprocal of β is sometimes referred to as the temperature: $\beta = 1 / kT$, where k is typically 1 or the Boltzmann constant, and T is the temperature. A higher temperature results in a more uniform output distribution (i.e. with higher entropy; it is "more random"), while a lower temperature results in a sharper output distribution, usually with one value dominating.

In some fields, the base is fixed, corresponding to a fixed scale, (Note: In statistical mechanics, fixing β is interpreted as having coldness and temperature of 1.) while in others the parameter β (or T) is varied.

The softmax function is a multiple-variable generalization of the logistic function.

== Interpretations ==
=== Smooth hot-one arg max ===
The softmax function is a smooth approximation to the one-hot version of the arg max function: the function whose vector component values are all zero, except that it has a value of 1 corresponding to the location of the tuple's largest element. Because the term "softmax" can also be used for the closely related, but real-valued, LogSumExp function, which is a smooth maximum, some prefer to describe the one-hot version as "softargmax". The term "softmax" is conventional in machine learning.

Formally, instead of considering the arg max as a function with categorical output $1, \dots, n$ (corresponding to the index), consider the arg max function with one-hot representation of the output (assuming there is a unique maximum arg):
$$\operatorname{arg\,max}(z_1, \dots, z_n) = (y_1, \dots, y_n) = (0, \dots, 0, 1, 0, \dots, 0),$$
where the output coordinate $y_i = 1$ if and only if $i$ is the arg max of $(z_1, \dots, z_n)$, meaning that $z_i$ is the unique maximum value of $(z_1, \dots, z_n)$. For example, in this encoding, $\operatorname{arg\,max}(1, 5, 10) = (0, 0, 1),$ since the third argument is the maximum.

This can be generalized to multiple arg max values (multiple equal $z_i$ being the maximum) by dividing the 1 between all max args; formally, $\tfrac1k$, where $k$ is the number of arguments assuming the maximum. For example, $\operatorname{arg\,max}(1, 5, 5) = \bigl(0, \tfrac12, \tfrac12\bigr),$ since the second and third argument are both the maximum. In case all arguments are equal, this is simply $\operatorname{arg\,max}(z, \dots, z) = \bigl(\tfrac1n, \dots, \tfrac1n\bigr).$ Points z with multiple arg max values are singular points (or singularities, and form the singular set) – these are the points where arg max is discontinuous (with a jump discontinuity) – while points with a single arg max are known as non-singular or regular points.

With the last expression given in the introduction, softmax is now a smooth approximation of arg max: as $\beta \to \infty$, softmax converges to arg max. There are various notions of convergence of a function; softmax converges to arg max pointwise, meaning that for each fixed input z as $\beta \to \infty$, $\sigma_\beta(\mathbf{z}) \to \operatorname{arg\,max}(\mathbf{z}).$ However, softmax does not converge uniformly to arg max, meaning intuitively that different points converge at different rates and may converge arbitrarily slowly. In fact, softmax is continuous, but arg max is not continuous at the singular set where two coordinates are equal, while the uniform limit of continuous functions is continuous. The reason it fails to converge uniformly is that for inputs where two coordinates are almost equal (and one is the maximum), the arg max is the index of one or the other, so a small change in input yields a large change in output. For example, $\sigma_\beta(1, 1.0001) \to (0, 1),$ but $\sigma_\beta(1, 0.9999) \to (1, 0),$ and $\sigma_\beta(1, 1) = \tfrac12$ for all inputs: the closer the points are to the singular set $(x, x)$, the slower they converge. However, softmax does converge compactly on the non-singular set.

Conversely, as $\beta \to -\infty$, softmax converges to arg min in the same way, where here the singular set is points with two arg min values. In the language of tropical analysis, the softmax is a deformation or "quantization" of arg max and arg min, corresponding to using the log semiring instead of the max-plus semiring (respectively min-plus semiring), and recovering the arg max or arg min by taking the limit is called "tropicalization" or "dequantization".

It is also the case that, for any fixed β, if one input $z_i$ is much larger than the others relative to the temperature, $T = 1/\beta$, the output is approximately the arg max. For example, a difference of 10 is large relative to a temperature of 1:
$$\sigma(0, 10) := \sigma_1(0, 10) = \left(\frac{1}{1 + e^{10}}, \frac{e^{10}}{1 + e^{10}}\right) \approx (0.00005, 0.99995).$$
However, if the difference is small relative to the temperature, the value is not close to the arg max. For example, a difference of 10 is small relative to a temperature of 100:
$$\sigma_{1/100}(0, 10) = \left(\frac{1}{1 + e^{1/10}}, \frac{e^{1/10}}{1 + e^{1/10}}\right) \approx (0.475, 0.525).$$
As $\beta \to \infty$, temperature goes to zero, $T = 1/\beta \to 0$, so eventually all differences become large (relative to a shrinking temperature), which gives another interpretation for the limit behavior.

=== Statistical mechanics ===
In statistical mechanics, the softmax function is known as the Boltzmann distribution (or Gibbs distribution): the index set ${1, \dots, k}$ are the microstates of the system; the inputs $z_i$ are the energies of that state; the denominator is known as the partition function, often denoted by Z; and the factor β is called the coldness (or thermodynamic beta, or inverse temperature).

== Applications ==
The softmax function is used in various multiclass classification methods, such as multinomial logistic regression (also known as softmax regression), multiclass linear discriminant analysis, naive Bayes classifiers, and artificial neural networks. Specifically, in multinomial logistic regression and linear discriminant analysis, the input to the function is the result of K distinct linear functions, and the predicted probability for the j-th class given a sample tuple x and a weighting vector w is
$$P(y = j \mid \mathbf{x}) = \frac{e^{\mathbf{x}^\mathrm{T} \mathbf{w}_j}}{\sum_{k=1}^K e^{\mathbf{x}^\mathrm{T}\mathbf{w}_k}}.$$
This can be seen as the composition of K linear functions $\mathbf{x} \mapsto \mathbf{x}^\mathrm{T} \mathbf{w}_1, \ldots, \mathbf{x} \mapsto \mathbf{x}^\mathrm{T} \mathbf{w}_K$ and the softmax function (where $\mathbf{x}^\mathrm{T} \mathbf{w}$ denotes the inner product of $\mathbf{x}$ and $\mathbf{w}$). The operation is equivalent to applying a linear operator defined by $\mathbf{w}$ to tuples $\mathbf{x}$, thus transforming the original, probably highly-dimensional, input to vectors in a K-dimensional space $\mathbb{R}^K$.

=== Neural networks ===
The standard softmax function is often used in the final layer of a neural-network-based classifier. Such networks are commonly trained under a log loss (or cross-entropy) regime, giving a non-linear variant of multinomial logistic regression.

Since the function maps a tuple and a specific index $i$ to a real value, the derivative needs to take the index into account:
$$\frac{\partial}{\partial q_k} \sigma(\textbf{q}, i) = \sigma(\textbf{q}, i) [\delta_{ik} - \sigma(\textbf{q}, k)].$$
This expression is symmetrical in the indexes $i, k$ and thus may also be expressed as
$$\frac{\partial}{\partial q_k} \sigma(\textbf{q}, i) = \sigma(\textbf{q}, k) [\delta_{ik} - \sigma(\textbf{q}, i)].$$
Here, the Kronecker delta is used for simplicity (see the derivative of a sigmoid function, being expressed via the function itself).

To ensure stable numerical computations, subtracting the maximum value from the input tuple is common. This approach, while not altering the output or the derivative theoretically, enhances stability by directly controlling the maximum exponent value computed.

If the function is scaled with the parameter $\beta$, then these expressions must be multiplied by $\beta$.

See multinomial logit for a probability model which uses the softmax activation function.

=== Reinforcement learning ===
In the field of reinforcement learning, a softmax function can be used to convert values into action probabilities. The function commonly used is
$$P_t(a) = \frac{\exp(q_t(a)/\tau)}{\sum_{i=1}^n \exp(q_t(i)/\tau)},$$
where the action value $q_t(a)$ corresponds to the expected reward of following action a and $\tau$ is called a temperature parameter (in allusion to statistical mechanics). For high temperatures ($\tau \to \infty$), all actions have nearly the same probability, and the lower the temperature, the more expected rewards affect the probability. For a low temperature ($\tau \to 0^+$), the probability of the action with the highest expected reward tends to 1.

== Computational complexity and remedies ==
In neural network applications, the number K of possible outcomes is often large, e.g. in case of neural language models that predict the most likely outcome out of a vocabulary which might contain millions of possible words. This can make the calculations for the softmax layer (i.e. the matrix multiplications to determine the $z_i$, followed by the application of the softmax function itself) computationally expensive. What's more, the gradient descent backpropagation method for training such a neural network involves calculating the softmax for every training example, and the number of training examples can also become large. The computational effort for the softmax became a major limiting factor in the development of larger neural language models, motivating various remedies to reduce training times.

Approaches that reorganize the softmax layer for more efficient calculation include the hierarchical softmax and the differentiated softmax. The hierarchical softmax (introduced by Morin and Bengio in 2005) uses a binary tree structure where the outcomes (vocabulary words) are the leaves and the intermediate nodes are suitably selected "classes" of outcomes, forming latent variables. The desired probability (softmax value) of a leaf (outcome) can then be calculated as the product of the probabilities of all nodes on the path from the root to that leaf. Ideally, when the tree is balanced, this would reduce the computational complexity from $O(K)$ to $O(\log_2 K)$. In practice, results depend on choosing a good strategy for clustering the outcomes into classes. A Huffman tree was used for this in Google's word2vec models (introduced in 2013) to achieve scalability.

A second kind of remedies is based on approximating the softmax (during training) with modified loss functions that avoid the calculation of the full normalization factor. These include methods that restrict the normalization sum to a sample of outcomes (e.g. importance sampling, target sampling).

== Numerical algorithms ==
The standard softmax is numerically unstable because of large exponentiations. The safe softmax method calculates instead
$$\sigma(\mathbf{z})_i = \frac{e^{\beta (z_i - m)}}{\sum_{j=1}^K e^{\beta (z_j - m)}},$$
where $m = \max_i z_i$ is the largest score involved. Subtracting by it guarantees that the exponentiations result in at most 1, see translation invariance in § Mathematical properties.

The attention mechanism in transformers takes three arguments: a "query vector" $q$, a list of "key vectors" $k_1, \dots, k_N$, and a list of "value vectors" $v_1, \dots, v_N$; and outputs a softmax-weighted sum over value vectors:
$$o = \sum_{i=1}^N \frac{e^{q^T k_i - m}}{\sum_{j=1}^N e^{q^T k_j - m}} v_i.$$
The standard softmax method involves several loops over the inputs, which would be bottlenecked by memory bandwidth.

It can be efficiently computed on a GPU cluster using the FlashAttention algorithm.

== Mathematical properties ==
Geometrically, the softmax function maps the Euclidean space $\mathbb{R}^K$ to the boundary of the standard $(K - 1)$-simplex, cutting the dimension by one (the range is a $(K - 1)$-dimensional simplex in $K$-dimensional space), due to the linear constraint that all output sum to 1, meaning that it lies on a hyperplane.

Along the main diagonal $(x, x, \dots, x),$ softmax is just the uniform distribution on outputs, $\bigl(\tfrac1n, \dots, \tfrac1n\bigr)$: equal scores yield equal probabilities.

More generally, softmax is invariant under translation by the same value in each coordinate: adding $\mathbf{c} = (c, \dots, c)$ to the inputs $\mathbf{z}$ yields $\sigma(\mathbf{z} + \mathbf{c}) = \sigma(\mathbf{z})$, because it multiplies each exponent by the same factor, $e^c$ (because $e^{z_i + c} = e^{z_i} \cdot e^c$), so the ratios do not change:
$$\sigma(\mathbf{z} + \mathbf{c})_j = \frac{e^{z_j + c}}{\sum_{k=1}^K e^{z_k + c}} = \frac{e^{z_j} \cdot e^c}{\sum_{k=1}^K e^{z_k} \cdot e^c} = \sigma(\mathbf{z})_j.$$

Geometrically, softmax is constant along diagonals: this is the dimension that is eliminated and corresponds to the softmax output being independent of a translation in the input scores (a choice of 0 score). One can normalize input scores by assuming that the sum is zero (subtract the average $c = \frac{1}{n} \sum z_i$), and then the softmax takes the hyperplane of points that sum to zero, $\sum z_i = 0$, to the open simplex of positive values that sum to $\sum \sigma(\mathbf{z})_i = 1$, analogously to how the exponent takes 0 to 1, $e^0 = 1$ and is positive.

By contrast, softmax is not invariant under scaling. For instance, $\sigma\bigl((0, 1)\bigr) = \Bigl(\tfrac{1}{1 + e}, \tfrac{e}{1 + e}\Bigr),$ but $\sigma\bigl((0, 2)\bigr) = \Bigl(\tfrac{1}{1 + e^2}, \tfrac{e^2}{1 + e^2}\Bigr).$

The standard logistic function is the special case for a 1-dimensional axis in 2-dimensional space, say, the x axis in the (x, y) plane. One variable is fixed at 0 (say, $z_2 = 0$), so $e^0 = 1$, and the other variable can vary, denote it $z_1 = x$, so the standard logistic function and its complement are
$$\frac{e^{z_1}}{e^{z_1} + e^{z_2}} = \frac{e^x}{e^x + 1}, \quad
\frac{e^{z_2}}{e^{z_1} + e^{z_2}} = \frac{1}{e^x + 1}.$$
The 1-dimensional input could alternatively be expressed as the line $\bigl(\tfrac12 x, -\tfrac12x\bigr)$, with outputs
$$\frac{e^{x/2}}{e^{x/2} + e^{-x/2}} = \frac{e^x}{e^x + 1}, \quad
\frac{e^{-x/2}}{e^{x/2} + e^{-x/2}} = \frac{1}{e^x + 1}.$$

=== Gradients ===
The softmax function is also the gradient of the LogSumExp function, $\operatorname{LSE}(z_1, \dots, z_K) = \log(\exp z_1 + \cdots + \exp z_K)$:
$$\frac{\partial}{\partial z_i} \operatorname{LSE}(\mathbf{z}) =
\frac{\exp z_i}{\sum_{k=1}^{K} \exp z_k} = \sigma(\mathbf{z})_i$$
for $i = 1, \dots , K$ and $\mathbf{z} = (z_1, \dots, z_K) \in\R^K$.

The gradient of softmax is
$$\frac{\partial}{\partial z_j} \sigma(\mathbf{z})_i =
\frac{\partial}{\partial z_j} \frac{\exp z_i}{\sum_{k=1}^{K} \exp z_k} =
\sigma_i (\delta_{ij} - \sigma_j),$$
where the Kronecker delta $\delta_{ij}$ equals $1$ if $i = j$ and is otherwise equal to $0$.

== History ==
The softmax function was used in statistical mechanics as the Boltzmann distribution in the foundational paper Boltzmann (1868), formalized and popularized in the influential textbook Gibbs (1902).

The use of the softmax in decision theory is credited to R. Duncan Luce, who used the axiom of independence of irrelevant alternatives in rational choice theory to deduce the softmax in Luce's choice axiom for relative preferences.

In machine learning, the term "softmax" is credited to John S. Bridle in two 1989 conference papers, Bridle (1990a) and Bridle (1990b):

We are concerned with feed-forward non-linear networks (multi-layer perceptrons, or MLPs) with multiple outputs. We wish to treat the outputs of the network as probabilities of alternatives (e.g. pattern classes), conditioned on the inputs. We look for appropriate output non-linearities and for appropriate criteria for adaptation of the parameters of the network (e.g. weights). We explain two modifications: probability scoring, which is an alternative to squared error minimisation, and a normalised exponential (softmax) multi-input generalisation of the logistic non-linearity.

For any input, the outputs must all be positive and they must sum to unity. ...

Given a set of unconstrained values, $V_j(x)$, we can ensure both conditions by using a normalised exponential transformation:
$$Q_j(x) = \left. e^{V_j(x)} \right/ \sum_k e^{V_k(x)}.$$
This transformation can be considered a multi-input generalisation of the logistic, operating on the whole output layer. It preserves the rank order of its input values, and is a differentiable generalisation of the "winner-take-all" operation of picking the maximum value. For this reason we like to refer to it as softmax.

== Example ==
With an input of (1, 2, 3, 4, 1, 2, 3), the softmax is approximately (0.024, 0.064, 0.175, 0.475, 0.024, 0.064, 0.175). The output has most of its weight where the "4" was in the original input. This is what the function is normally used for: to highlight the largest values and suppress values which are significantly below the maximum value. But note: a change of temperature changes the output. When the temperature is multiplied by 10, the inputs are effectively (0.1, 0.2, 0.3, 0.4, 0.1, 0.2, 0.3) and the softmax is approximately (0.125, 0.138, 0.153, 0.169, 0.125, 0.138, 0.153). This shows that high temperatures de-emphasize the maximum value.

Computation of this example using Python code:

>>> import numpy as np
>>> z = np.array([1.0, 2.0, 3.0, 4.0, 1.0, 2.0, 3.0])
>>> beta = 1.0
>>> np.exp(beta * z) / np.sum(np.exp(beta * z))
array([0.02364054, 0.06426166, 0.1746813, 0.474833, 0.02364054,
       0.06426166, 0.1746813])

== Alternatives ==
The softmax function generates probability predictions densely distributed over its support. Other functions like sparsemax or α-entmax can be used when sparse probability predictions are desired. Also the Gumbel-softmax reparametrization trick can be used when sampling from a discrete-discrete distribution needs to be mimicked in a differentiable manner.

== See also ==
- Softplus
- Multinomial logistic regression
- Dirichlet distribution – an alternative way to sample categorical distributions
- Partition function
- Exponential tilting – a generalization of Softmax to more general probability distributions
