= Voorhoeve =

Voorhoeve is a Dutch surname. Notable people with the surname include:

- Clemens Voorhoeve (born 1930), Dutch linguist
- Joris Voorhoeve (born 1945), Dutch politician and academic
- Marc Voorhoeve (1950–2011), Dutch mathematician
  - Voorhoeve index of a complex function, introduced by Marc Voorhoeve
