= Equivalent radius =

Radius of a circle or sphere equivalent to a non-circular or non-spherical object

In applied sciences, the equivalent radius (or mean radius) is the radius of a circle or sphere with the same perimeter, area, or volume of a non-circular or non-spherical object. The equivalent diameter (or mean diameter) ($D$) is twice the equivalent radius.

== Perimeter equivalent ==
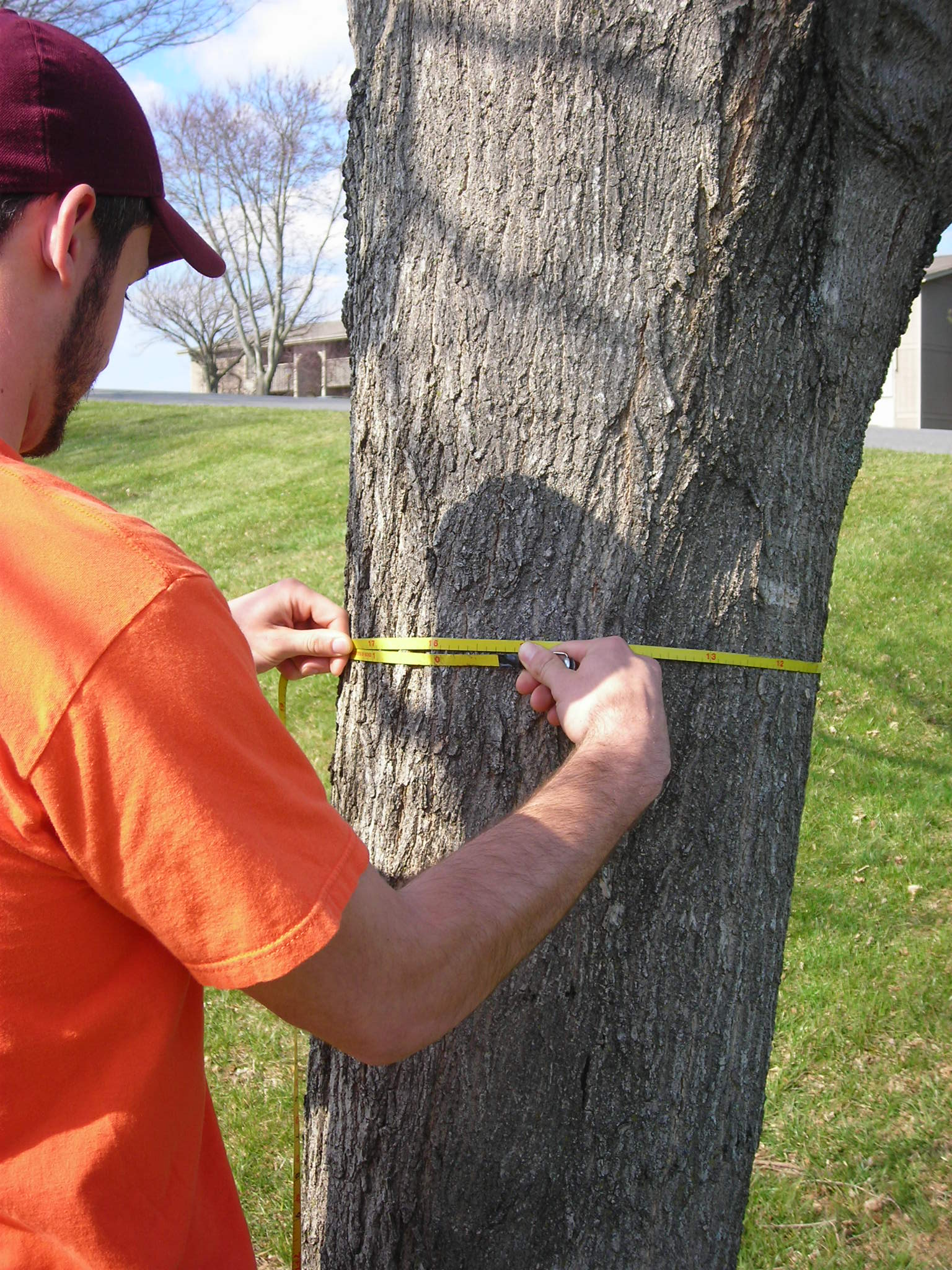
Measurement of tree circumference. The tape is calibrated to show diameter at breast height, assuming a circular shape.

The perimeter of a circle of radius R is $2 \pi R$. Given the perimeter of a non-circular object P, one can calculate its perimeter-equivalent radius by setting

$$P = 2\pi R_\text{eq}$$

or, alternatively:

$$R_\text{eq} = \frac{P}{2\pi}$$

For example, a square of side L has a perimeter of $4L$. Setting that perimeter to be equal to that of a circle imply that

$$R_\text{eq} = \frac{4L}{2 \pi} = \frac{2L}{\pi} \approx 0.6366 L$$

Applications:

- US hat size is the circumference of the head, measured in inches, divided by pi, rounded to the nearest 1/8 inch. This corresponds to the 1D mean diameter.
- Diameter at breast height is the circumference of tree trunk, measured at height of 4.5 feet, divided by pi. This corresponds to the 1D mean diameter. It can be measured directly by a girthing tape.

== Area equivalent ==
The area-equivalent radius of a 2D object is the radius of a circle with the same area as the object

Cross sectional area of a trapezoidal open channel, red highlights the wetted perimeter, where water is in contact with the channel. The hydraulic diameter is the equivalent circular configuration with the same circumference as the wetted perimeter.

The area of a circle of radius R is $\pi R^2$. Given the area of a non-circular object A, one can calculate its area-equivalent radius by setting

$$A = \pi R^2_\text{eq}$$

or, alternatively:

$$R_\text{eq} = \sqrt{\frac{A}{\pi}}$$

Often the area considered is that of a cross section.

For example, a square of side length L has an area of $L^2$. Setting that area to be equal that of a circle imply that

$$R_\text{eq} = \sqrt{\frac{L^2}{\pi}} = \sqrt{\frac{1}{\pi}} L \approx 0.5642 L$$

Similarly, an ellipse with semi-major axis $a$ and semi-minor axis $b$ has area of $\pi ab$, and therefore

$$R_\text{eq} = \sqrt{\frac{\pi ab}{\pi}} = \sqrt{a b}$$.

Applications:

- The hydraulic diameter is similarly defined as 4 times the cross-sectional area of a pipe A, divided by its "wetted" perimeter P. For a circular pipe of radius R, at full flow, this is

$$D_\text{H} = \frac{4 \pi R^2}{2 \pi R} = 2R$$
as one would expect. This is equivalent to the above definition of the 2D mean diameter. However, for historical reasons, the hydraulic radius is defined as the cross-sectional area of a pipe A, divided by its wetted perimeter P, which leads to $D_\text{H} = 4 R_\text{H}$, and the hydraulic radius is half of the 2D mean radius.

- In aggregate classification, the equivalent diameter is the "diameter of a circle with an equal aggregate sectional area", which is calculated by $D = 2 \sqrt{\frac{A}{\pi}}$. It is used in many digital image processing programs.

== Volume equivalent ==
A sphere (top), rotational ellipsoid (left) and triaxial ellipsoid (right)

The volume of a sphere of radius R is $\frac{4}{3}\pi R^3$. Given the volume of a non-spherical object V, one can calculate its volume-equivalent radius by setting

$$V = \frac{4}{3}\pi R^3_\text{eq}$$

or, alternatively:

$$R_\text{eq} = \sqrt[3]{\frac{3V}{4\pi}}$$

For example, a cube of side length L has a volume of $L^3$. Setting that volume to be equal that of a sphere imply that

$$R_\text{eq} = \sqrt[3]{\frac{3L^3}{4\pi}} = \sqrt[3]{\frac{3}{4\pi}} L \approx 0.6204 L$$

Similarly, a tri-axial ellipsoid with axes $a$, $b$ and $c$ has a volume of $\frac{4}{3}\pi abc$, and therefore

$$R_\text{eq} = \sqrt[3]{\frac{3\frac{4}{3}\pi abc}{4\pi}} =\sqrt[3]{abc}$$.

The formula for a rotational ellipsoid is the special case where $a=b$

$R_\text{eq}=\sqrt[3]{a^{2} \cdot c }$.

Applications:

- For planet Earth, which can be approximated as an oblate spheroid with radii 6378.1 km and 6356.8 km, the 3D mean radius is $R=\sqrt[3]{6378.1^{2}\cdot6356.8}=6371.0\text{ km}$.

== Other equivalences ==
=== Surface-area equivalent radius ===
The surface area of a sphere of radius R is $4\pi R^2$. Given the surface area of a non-spherical object A, one can calculate its surface area-equivalent radius by setting

$$4\pi R^2_\text{eq} = A$$

or equivalently

$$R_\text{eq} = \sqrt{\frac{A}{4\pi}}$$

For example, a cube of length L has a surface area of $6L^2$. A cube therefore has an surface area-equivalent radius of

$$R_\text{eq} = \sqrt{\frac{6L^2}{4\pi}} \approx 0.6910 L$$

=== Curvature-equivalent radius ===
An osculating circle

The osculating circle and osculating sphere define curvature-equivalent radii at a particular point of tangency for plane figures and solid figures, respectively.

== See also ==
- Antenna equivalent radius
- Cloud drop effective radius
- Cubic mean
- Earth ellipsoid
- Earth radius
- Galaxy effective radius
- Geoid
- Geometric mean
- Semidiameter
