= Identric mean =

The identric mean of two positive real numbers x, y is defined as:

$$\begin{align}
I(x,y)
&=
\frac{1}{e}\cdot
\lim_{(\xi,\eta)\to(x,y)}
\sqrt[\xi-\eta]{\frac{\xi^\xi}{\eta^\eta}}
\\[8pt]
&=
\lim_{(\xi,\eta)\to(x,y)}
\exp\left(\frac{\xi\cdot\ln\xi-\eta\cdot\ln\eta}{\xi-\eta}-1\right)
\\[8pt]
&=
\begin{cases}
x & \text{if }x=y \\[8pt]
\frac{1}{e} \sqrt[x-y]{\frac{x^x}{y^y}} & \text{else}
\end{cases}
\end{align}$$

It can be derived from the mean value theorem by considering the secant of the graph of the function $x \mapsto x\cdot \ln x$. It can be generalized to more variables according by the mean value theorem for divided differences. The identric mean is a special case of the Stolarsky mean.

== AM-IM-GM inequality ==
Recall that $\int\log x\,dx=x(\log x-1)$. Since the integrand is strictly concave, using two variations of the Riemann integral to approximate it (with only one summand),

1. the trapezoidal rule gives a lower bound, since all secant lines interpolating two points on the curve lie beneath it.

2. the midpoint rule gives an upper bound, since its tangent lines intersect it only at the point they're drawn from, and lie above it elsewhere.

These give the inequalities

$$\begin{aligned}
&\frac{\log x+\log y}2\le\overbrace{y(\log y-1)-x(\log x-1)\over y-x}^{\frac1{y-x}\int_x^y\log t\,dt}\le\log\frac{x+y}2\\
\overset{\exp}\implies&\underset\text{GM}{\sqrt{xy}}\le\underset\text{IM}{\frac1ey^{y\over y-x}x^{x\over x-y}}\le\underset\text{AM}{x+y\over2}
\end{aligned}$$

By setting $y=1$ and using this as the ratio between successive terms, the IM-GM inequality states that $\sqrt{2\pi n}(\frac ne)^n\over n!$ is strictly increasing while the AM-IM states that $\sqrt{2\pi}(\frac{n+1/2}e)^{n+1/2}\over n!$ is strictly decreasing; together with their limits at $n=\infty$ being $1$, this establishes that the former variant of Stirling's approximation is a lower bound on $n!$ while the latter (which appeared first in James Stirling's notes) is an upper bound.

== See also ==
- Mean
- Logarithmic mean
