= Neuman–Sándor mean =

In mathematics, the Neuman–Sándor mean of two positive, unequal numbers $a$ and $b$ is defined as

$$M(a,b) = \frac{a-b} {2\operatorname{arcsinh}\left(\frac{a-b} {a+b}\right)}.$$

This mean $M$ satisfies the inequality $A<M<T$, where $A$ is the unweighted arithmetic mean $A=(a+b)/2$ and $T$ is the second Seiffert mean

$$T(a,b)=\frac{a-b} {2\arctan\left(\frac{a-b} {a+b}\right)}.$$

The M(a,b) mean, introduced by Edward Neuman and József Sándor, has recently been the subject of intensive research and many remarkable inequalities for this mean can be found in the literature. Several authors obtained sharp and optimal bounds for the Neuman–Sándor mean. Neuman and others utilized this mean to study other bivariate means and inequalities.

== See also ==
- Mean
  - Arithmetic mean
  - Geometric mean
  - Stolarsky mean
  - Identric mean
- Means in Mathematical Analysis
