= CHM =

CHM may refer to:

== Biology and medicine ==
- CHM, abbreviation for Clearing House Mechanism under the Convention on Biological Diversity
- CHM, a human gene that encodes Rab escort protein 1
- Choroideremia, a retinal disease caused by mutations in the CHM gene
- ChM, advanced qualification in surgery, (Magister Chirurgiae). See Master of Surgery
- Chinese herbal medicine abbreviation, see Chinese herbology
- Christian Healthcare Ministries, a Health care sharing ministry
- Children's Hospital of Michigan, in Detroit, Michigan
- Commission on Human Medicines, a committee of the UK's Medicines and Healthcare Products Regulatory Agency
- Michigan State University College of Human Medicine

== Computing ==
- ".chm", filename extension for ChemDraw Chemical Structure files
- ".chm", filename extension for Microsoft Compiled HTML Help files

== Institutions ==
- College Hockey Mid-America, an American Collegiate Hockey Association
- Congregation of the Humility of Mary, a congregation of religious sisters in the Catholic Church
- Conservative Holiness Movement, a theologically conservative group of Methodist, Quaker, Anabaptist and Restorationist denominations

== Museums ==
- Cultural heritage management, the vocation and practice of managing cultural heritage
- Chicago History Museum, founded in 1856 to study and interpret Chicago's history
- Colorado History Museum, a museum in Denver on the history of the state of Colorado
- Computer History Museum, established in 1996 in Mountain View, California

== Transportation ==
- CHM, IATA code for Tnte. FAP Jaime Montreuil Morales Airport, Peru
- CHM, Amtrak station code for Illinois Terminal in Champaign, Illinois
- Chatham railway station, Melbourne

== Other ==
- chm, ISO 639 code for Mari language
- CHM, abbreviation for contraharmonic mean
- Ch.M., postnominal for Magistral Chaplain, used by the Sovereign Military Order of Malta
- ChM, the label of the Chelyabinsk meteor
- Channel M (Southeast Asia), a cable TV channel in Southeast Asia
