= Lehmer mean =

Mathematic formula for deriving a mean

In mathematics, the Lehmer mean of a tuple $x$ of positive real numbers, named after Derrick Henry Lehmer, is defined as:

$$L_p(\mathbf{x}) = \frac{\sum_{k=1}^n x_k^p}{\sum_{k=1}^n x_k^{p-1}}.$$

The weighted Lehmer mean with respect to a tuple $w$ of positive weights is defined as:

$$L_{p,w}(\mathbf{x}) = \frac{\sum_{k=1}^n w_k\cdot x_k^p}{\sum_{k=1}^n w_k\cdot x_k^{p-1}}.$$

The Lehmer mean is an alternative to power means for interpolating between minimum and maximum via arithmetic mean and harmonic mean.

== Properties ==
The derivative of $p \mapsto L_p(\mathbf{x})$ is non-negative

$$\frac{\partial}{\partial p} L_p(\mathbf{x}) =
\frac
{\left(\sum_{j=1}^n \sum_{k=j+1}^n
\left[x_j - x_k\right] \cdot \left[\ln(x_j) - \ln(x_k)\right] \cdot \left[x_j \cdot x_k\right]^{p-1}\right)}
{\left(\sum_{k=1}^n x_k^{p-1}\right)^2},$$

thus this function is monotonic and the inequality

$$p \le q \Longrightarrow L_p(\mathbf{x}) \le L_q(\mathbf{x})$$

holds.

The derivative of the weighted Lehmer mean is:

$$\frac{\partial L_{p,w}(\mathbf{x})}{\partial p} =
\frac{(\sum w x^{p-1})(\sum wx^p\ln{x}) - (\sum wx^p)(\sum wx^{p-1}\ln{x})}{(\sum wx^{p-1})^2}$$

== Special cases ==
- $\lim_{p \to -\infty} L_p(\mathbf{x})$ is the minimum of the elements of $\mathbf{x}$.
- $L_0(\mathbf{x})$ is the harmonic mean.
- $L_\frac{1}{2}\left((x_1, x_2)\right)$ is the geometric mean of the two values $x_1$ and $x_2$.
- $L_1(\mathbf{x})$ is the arithmetic mean.
- $L_2(\mathbf{x})$ is the contraharmonic mean.
- $\lim_{p \to \infty} L_p(\mathbf{x})$ is the maximum of the elements of $\mathbf{x}$.
  Sketch of a proof: Without loss of generality let $x_1,\dots,x_k$ be the values which equal the maximum. Then $L_p(\mathbf{x}) = x_1\cdot\frac{k + \left(\frac{x_{k+1}}{x_1}\right)^p + \cdots + \left(\frac{x_n}{x_1}\right)^p}{k + \left(\frac{x_{k+1}}{x_1}\right)^{p-1} + \cdots + \left(\frac{x_n}{x_1}\right)^{p-1}}$

== Applications ==
=== Signal processing ===
Like a power mean, a Lehmer mean serves a non-linear moving average which is shifted towards small signal values for small $p$ and emphasizes big signal values for big $p$. Given an efficient implementation of a moving arithmetic mean called smooth you can implement a moving Lehmer mean according to the following Haskell code.

lehmerSmooth :: Floating a => ([a] -> [a]) -> a -> [a] -> [a]
lehmerSmooth smooth p xs =
    zipWith (/)
            (smooth (map (**p) xs))
            (smooth (map (**(p-1)) xs))

- For big $p$ it can serve an envelope detector on a rectified signal.
- For small $p$ it can serve an baseline detector on a mass spectrum.

Gonzalez and Woods call this a "contraharmonic mean filter" described for varying values of p (however, as above, the contraharmonic mean can refer to the specific case $p = 2$). Their convention is to substitute p with the order of the filter Q:

$$f(x) = \frac{\sum_{k=1}^n x_k^{Q+1}}{\sum_{k=1}^n x_k^Q}.$$

Q=0 is the arithmetic mean. Positive Q can reduce pepper noise and negative Q can reduce salt noise.

== See also ==
- Mean
- Power mean
