= Chisini mean =

In mathematics, particularly statistics, a Chisini mean, representative mean, or substitution mean of values x_{1}, ..., x_{n} for an n-parameter function f is a value M such that f(M,M, ..., M) = f(x_{1},x_{2}, ..., x_{n}). This can be found by defining $\phi(x) = f(\underbrace{x, \dots, x}_{\text{repeated n times}})$, then computing $M = \phi^{-1}(f(x_1, \dots, f_n))$.

For an operation to be generally considered a mean, it should satisfy the consistency property: applying it to a constant c repeated one or more times produces c as the output. Accordingly, let f be such a mean, so then φ(x) = x, φ^{-1}(y) = y, and M = f(x_{1}, ..., x_{n}). Therefore, any mean that obeys the consistency property can be interpreted as a Chisini mean. However, the Chisini mean is often useful for converting some other aggregation function into a mean.

While Oscar Chisini was arguably the first to deal with "substitution means" in some depth in 1929, the definition of a mean as above appears in an 1839 Penny Cyclopaedia article by Augustus De Morgan.

== See also ==
- Fréchet mean
- Generalized mean
- Jensen's inequality
- Quasi-arithmetic mean
- Stolarsky mean
