= Spherical mean =

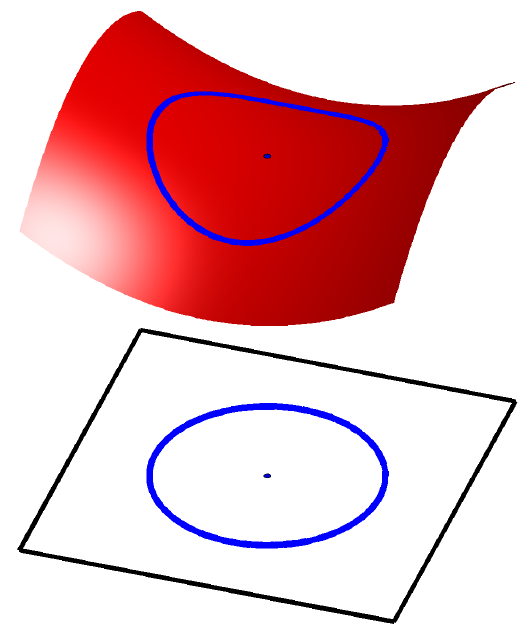
The spherical mean of a function $u$ (shown in red) is the average of the values $u(y)$ (top, in blue) with $y$ on a "sphere" of given radius around a given point (bottom, in blue).

In mathematics, the spherical mean of a function around a point is the average of all values of that function on a sphere of given radius centered at that point.

== Definition ==
Consider an open set U in the Euclidean space R^{n} and a continuous function u defined on U with real or complex values. Let x be a point in U and r > 0 be such that the closed ball B(x, r) of center x and radius r is contained in U. The spherical mean over the sphere of radius r centered at x is defined as

$$\frac{1}{\omega_{n-1}(r)}\int\limits_{\partial B(x, r)} \! u(y) \, \mathrm{d} S(y)$$

where ∂B(x, r) is the (n − 1)-sphere forming the boundary of B(x, r), dS denotes integration with respect to spherical measure and ω_{n−1}(r) is the "surface area" of this (n − 1)-sphere.

Equivalently, the spherical mean is given by

$$\frac{1}{\omega_{n-1}}\int\limits_{\|y\|=1} \! u(x+ry) \, \mathrm{d}S(y)$$

where ω_{n−1} is the area of the (n − 1)-sphere of radius 1.

The spherical mean is often denoted as

$$\int\limits_{\partial B(x, r)}\!\!\!\!\!\!\!\!\!-\,  u(y) \, \mathrm{d} S(y).$$

The spherical mean is also defined for Riemannian manifolds in a natural manner.

== Properties and uses ==
- From the continuity of $u$ it follows that the function
  $$r\to \int\limits_{\partial B(x, r)}\!\!\!\!\!\!\!\!\!-\, u(y) \,\mathrm{d}S(y)$$
  is continuous, and that its limit as $r\to 0$ is $u(x).$
- Spherical means can be used to solve the Cauchy problem for the wave equation $\partial^2_t u=c^2\,\Delta u$ in odd space dimension. The result, known as Kirchhoff's formula, is derived by using spherical means to reduce the wave equation in $\R^n$ (for odd $n$) to the wave equation in $\R$, and then using d'Alembert's formula. The expression itself is presented in wave equation article.
- If $U$ is an open set in $\mathbb R^n$ and $u$ is a C^{2} function defined on $U$, then $u$ is harmonic if and only if for all $x$ in $U$ and all $r>0$ such that the closed ball $B(x, r)$ is contained in $U$ one has
  $$u(x)=\int\limits_{\partial B(x, r)}\!\!\!\!\!\!\!\!\!-\, u(y) \, \mathrm{d}S(y).$$
  This result can be used to prove the maximum principle for harmonic functions.
