= Racetrack principle =

In calculus, the racetrack principle describes the movement and growth of two functions in terms of their derivatives.

This principle is derived from the fact that if a horse named Frank Fleetfeet always runs faster than a horse named Greg Gooseleg, then if Frank and Greg start a race from the same place and the same time, then Frank will win. More briefly, the horse that starts fast and stays fast wins.

In symbols:

if $f'(x)>g'(x)$ for all $x>0$, and if $f(0)=g(0)$, then $f(x)>g(x)$ for all $x>0$.

or, substituting ≥ for > produces the theorem

if $f'(x) \ge g'(x)$ for all $x>0$, and if $f(0)=g(0)$, then $f(x) \ge g(x)$ for all $x \ge 0$.

which can be proved in a similar way

== Proof ==
This principle can be proven by considering the function $h(x) = f(x) - g(x)$. If we were to take the derivative we would notice that for $x>0$,

$$h'= f'-g'>0.$$

Also notice that $h(0) = 0$. Combining these observations, we can use the mean value theorem on the interval $[0, x]$ and get

$$0 < h'(x_0)= \frac{h(x)-h(0)}{x-0}= \frac{f(x)-g(x)}{x}.$$

By assumption, $x>0$, so multiplying both sides by $x$ gives $f(x) - g(x) > 0$. This implies $f(x) > g(x)$.

== Generalizations ==
The statement of the racetrack principle can be slightly generalized as follows;

if $f'(x)>g'(x)$ for all $x>a$, and if $f(a)=g(a)$, then $f(x)>g(x)$ for all $x>a$.

as above, substituting ≥ for > produces the theorem

if $f'(x) \ge g'(x)$ for all $x>a$, and if $f(a)=g(a)$, then $f(x) \ge g(x)$ for all $x>a$.

=== Proof ===
This generalization can be proved from the racetrack principle as follows:

Consider functions $f_2(x)=f(x+a)$ and $g_2(x)=g(x+a)$. Given that $f'(x)>g'(x)$ for all $x>a$, and $f(a)=g(a)$,

$f_2'(x)>g_2'(x)$ for all $x>0$, and $f_2(0)=g_2(0)$, which by the proof of the racetrack principle above means $f_2(x)>g_2(x)$ for all $x>0$ so $f(x)>g(x)$ for all $x>a$.

== Application ==
The racetrack principle can be used to prove a lemma necessary to show that the exponential function grows faster than any power function. The lemma required is that

$$e^{x}>x$$

for all real $x$. This is obvious for $x<0$ but the racetrack principle can be used for $x>0$. To see how it is used we consider the functions

$$f(x)=e^{x}$$

and

$$g(x)=x+1.$$

Notice that $f(0) = g(0)$ and that

$$e^{x}>1$$

because the exponential function is always increasing (monotonic) so $f'(x)>g'(x)$. Thus by the racetrack principle $f(x)>g(x)$. Thus,

$$e^{x}>x+1>x$$

for all $x>0$.
