= Oscar Chisini =

Italian mathematician (1889–1967)

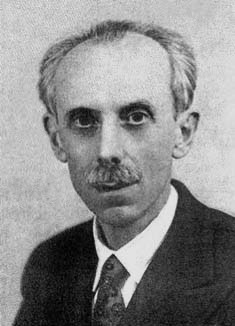
- Born: 14 March 1889; Bergamo
- Died: 10 April 1967 (aged 78); Milan
- Education: University of Bologna
- Occupations: Mathematician, statistician
- Known for: Chisini mean

Oscar Chisini (14 March 1889 – 10 April 1967) was an Italian mathematician. He introduced the Chisini mean in 1929.

== Biography ==
Chisini was born in Bergamo.

In 1929, he founded the Institute of Mathematics (Istituto di Matematica) at the University of Milan, along with Gian Antonio Maggi and Giulio Vivanti. He then held the position of chairman of the institute from the early 1930s until 1959.

He graduated from the University of Bologna in 1912, having studied under Federigo Enriques. In 1952 he had the appellation "Federigo Enriques" attached to the institute, to commemorate his memory. This name has been maintained by the institute, and by the Department of Mathematics (which it became) since 1982.

He was a major contributor to the Enciclopedia Italiana, and from 1946 to 1967 editor of the journal Il periodico di matematiche.

The Chisini conjecture in algebraic geometry is a uniqueness question for morphisms of generic smooth projective surfaces, branched on a cuspidal curve. A special case is the question of the uniqueness of the covering of the projective plane, branched over a generic curve of degree at least five.

Chisini died in Milan in 1967.
