= Spherical measure =

In mathematics — specifically, in geometric measure theory — spherical measure σ^{n} is the "natural" Borel measure on the n-sphere S^{n}. Spherical measure is often normalized so that it is a probability measure on the sphere, i.e. so that σ^{n}(S^{n}) = 1.

== Definition of spherical measure ==
There are several ways to define spherical measure. One way is to use the usual "round" or "arclength" metric ρ_{n} on S^{n}; that is, for points x and y in S^{n}, ρ_{n}(x, y) is defined to be the (Euclidean) angle that they subtend at the centre of the sphere (the origin of R^{n+1}). Now construct n-dimensional Hausdorff measure H^{n} on the metric space (S^{n}, ρ_{n}) and define

$$\sigma^{n} = \frac{1}{H^{n}(\mathbf{S}^{n})} H^{n}.$$

One could also have given S^{n} the metric that it inherits as a subspace of the Euclidean space R^{n+1}; the same spherical measure results from this choice of metric.

Another method uses Lebesgue measure λ^{n+1} on the ambient Euclidean space R^{n+1}: for any measurable subset A of S^{n}, define σ^{n}(A) to be the (n + 1)-dimensional volume of the "wedge" in the ball B^{n+1} that it subtends at the origin. That is,

$$\sigma^{n}(A) := \frac{1}{\alpha(n + 1)} \lambda^{n + 1} ( \{ t x \mid x \in A, t \in [0, 1] \} ),$$

where

$\alpha(m) := \lambda^{m} (\mathbf{B}_{1}^{m} (0)) \text{ } (\mathbf{B}_1^{m} (0) \text{ is the ball of radius 1 centered at the origin in }$R^{n+1}).

The fact that all these methods define the same measure on S^{n} follows from an elegant result of Christensen: all these measures are obviously uniformly distributed on S^{n}, and any two uniformly distributed Borel regular measures on a separable metric space must be constant (positive) multiples of one another. Since all our candidate σ^{n}'s have been normalized to be probability measures, they are all the same measure.

== Relationship with other measures ==
The relationship of spherical measure to Hausdorff measure on the sphere and Lebesgue measure on the ambient space has already been discussed.

Spherical measure has a nice relationship to Haar measure on the orthogonal group. Let O(n) denote the orthogonal group acting on R^{n} and let θ^{n} denote its normalized Haar measure (so that θ^{n}(O(n)) = 1). The orthogonal group also acts on the sphere S^{n−1}. Then, for any x ∈ S^{n−1} and any A ⊆ S^{n−1},

$$\theta^{n}(\{ g \in \mathrm{O}(n) \mid g(x) \in A \}) = \sigma^{n - 1}(A).$$

In the case that S^{n} is a topological group (that is, when n is 0, 1 or 3), spherical measure σ^{n} coincides with (normalized) Haar measure on S^{n}.

== Isoperimetric inequality ==
There is an isoperimetric inequality for the sphere with its usual metric and spherical measure (see Ledoux & Talagrand, chapter 1):

If A ⊆ S^{n−1} is any Borel set and B⊆ S^{n−1} is a ρ_{n}-ball with the same σ^{n}-measure as A, then, for any r > 0,

$$\sigma^{n}(A_{r}) \geq \sigma^{n}(B_{r}),$$

where A_{r} denotes the "inflation" of A by r, i.e.

$$A_{r} := \{ x \in \mathbf{S}^{n} \mid \rho_{n}(x, A) \leq r \}.$$

In particular, if σ^{n}(A) ≥ 1/2 and n ≥ 2, then

$$\sigma^{n}(A_{r}) \geq 1 - \sqrt{\frac{\pi}{8}} \, \exp \left( - \frac{(n - 1) r^{2}}{2} \right).$$
