= Edward Neuman =

Polish-American mathematician

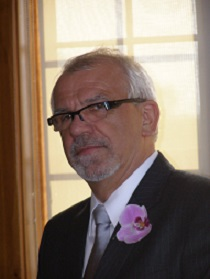
- Born: Edward Jerzy Neuman; September 19, 1943 (age 82); Rydułtowy, Poland
- Education: University of Wrocław
- Known for: Neuman–Sándor mean and Neuman means
- Scientific career
- Fields: Mathematician and mathematics professor
- Workplaces: Southern Illinois University
- Doctoral advisor: wmpl:Stefan Paszkowski

Edward Neuman (born September 19, 1943 in Rydułtowy, Silesian Voivodeship, Poland) is a Polish-American mathematician, currently a professor emeritus of mathematics at Southern Illinois University Carbondale.

== Academic career ==
Neuman received his Ph.D. in mathematics from the University of Wrocław in 1972 under the supervision of wmpl:Stefan Paszkowski. His dissertation was entitled "Projections in Uniform Polynomial Approximation." He held positions at the Institute of Mathematics and the Institute of Computer Sciences of the University of Wroclaw, and the Institute of Applied Mathematics Bonn in Germany. In 1986, he took a permanent faculty position at Southern Illinois University.

== Contributions ==
Neuman has contributed 130 journal articles in computational mathematics and mathematical inequalities such as the Ky Fan inequality, on bivariate means, and mathematical approximations and expansions. Neuman also developed software for computing with spline functions and wrote several tutorials for the MATLAB programing software. Among the mathematical concepts named after Edward Neuman are Neuman–Sándor Mean and Neuman Means, which are useful tools for advancing the theory of special functions including Jacobi elliptic functions:

- The Neuman–Sándor mean
- The Neuman Means of the first kind
- The Neuman Means of the second kind

== Awards and honors ==
Neuman was named the Outstanding Teacher in 2001 in the College of Science at Southern Illinois University Carbondale. Neuman worked as a Validator for the original release and publication of the National Institute of Standards and Technology (NIST) Handbook and Digital Library of Mathematical Functions. He serves on the Editorial Boards of the Journal of Inequalities in Pure and Applied Mathematics, the Journal of Inequalities and Special Functions, and Journal of Mathematical Inequalities.

== Selected works ==
The most frequently cited works by Neuman include:

- "On the Schwab–Borchardt mean" Math Pannon 14(2) (2003), 253–266.
- "On the Schwab–Borchardt mean II" Math Pannon 17(1) (2006), 49–59.
- "The weighted logarithmic mean" J. Math. Anal. Appl. 188 (1994), 885–900.

== See also ==
- List of Polish mathematicians
