= Salt-and-pepper noise =

Noise in the form of sparse, random black and white pixels on digital images

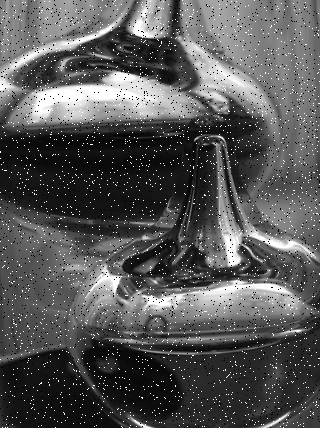
An image with salt-and-pepper noise

Salt-and-pepper noise, also known as impulse noise, is a form of noise sometimes seen on digital images. For black-and-white or grayscale images, it presents as sparsely occurring white and black pixels, giving the appearance of an image sprinkled with salt and pepper.

== Cause ==
Salt-and-pepper noise can be caused by sharp and sudden disturbances in the image signal. These may be from transmission errors, corrupted pixel elements in the camera sensors, or faulty memory locations in the storage media.

== Removal ==
An effective noise reduction method for this type of noise is a median filter or a morphological filter. For reducing either salt noise or pepper noise, but not both, a contraharmonic mean filter can be effective.

Linear filters are generally ineffective for removing impulse noise.

== See also ==
- Defective pixel
