= Rolle's theorem =

Theorem in real analysis

If the real function f is continuous on the proper closed interval [a, b], differentiable on the open interval (a, b), and f(a) = f(b), then there exists c in (a, b) such that f′(c) = 0.

In calculus and real analysis, Rolle's theorem (or lemma) states that a real-valued differentiable function which attains equal values at two distinct points must have a stationary point somewhere between them, that is, a point where its derivative is zero. The theorem is named after Michel Rolle.

The theorem is a special case of, and is used to prove, the mean value theorem.

== Statement ==
If a real function f is continuous on a proper closed interval [a, b], differentiable on the open interval (a, b), and f(a) = f(b), then there exists at least one c in the open interval (a, b) such that
$$f'(c) = 0.$$

== History ==
In the 12th century Bhāskara II states an early form of Rolle's theorem in his work, though it was stated without a modern formal proof. Although the theorem is named after Michel Rolle, Rolle's 1691 proof covered only the case of polynomial functions. His proof did not use the methods of differential calculus, which at that point in his life he considered to be fallacious. The theorem was first proved by Cauchy in 1823 as a corollary of a proof of the mean value theorem. The name "Rolle's theorem" was first used by Moritz Wilhelm Drobisch of Germany in 1834 and by Giusto Bellavitis of Italy in 1846.

== Examples and counterexamples ==
=== Differentiability is not needed at the endpoints: Half circle ===
For a positive real number r, consider the function $f:[-r,r]\to\mathbb{R}$ such that $f(x)=\sqrt{r^2 - x^2}$ for all $x\in[-r,r].$

Its graph is the upper semicircle centered at the origin. This function is continuous on the closed interval [−r, r] and differentiable in the open interval (−r, r), but not differentiable at the endpoints −r and r, as the graph of f has vertical tangents at those points. Since f(−r) = f(r), Rolle's theorem applies, and indeed, there is a point where the derivative of f is zero. The theorem applies even when the function cannot be differentiated at the endpoints because it only requires the function to be differentiable in the open interval.

=== Differentiability is needed within the open interval: Absolute value ===
The graph of the absolute value function

If differentiability fails at an interior point of the interval, the conclusion of Rolle's theorem may not hold. Consider the absolute value function
$$f(x) = |x|,\quad x \in [-1, 1].$$

Then f(−1) = f(1), but there is no c between −1 and 1 for which the f′(c) is zero. This is because that function, although continuous, is not differentiable at x = 0. The derivative of f changes its sign at x = 0, but without attaining the value 0. The theorem cannot be applied to this function because it does not satisfy the condition that the function must be differentiable for every x in the open interval.

=== Functions with zero derivative ===
Rolle's theorem implies that a differentiable function whose derivative is $0$ in an interval is constant in this interval.

Indeed, if a and b are two points in an interval where a function f is differentiable, then the function
$$g(x)=f(x)-f(a)-\frac{f(b)-f(a)}{b-a}(x-a)$$
satisfies the hypotheses of Rolle's theorem on the interval $[a,b]$.

If the derivative of $f$ is zero everywhere, the derivative of $g$ is
$$g'(x)=-\frac{f(b)-f(a)}{b-a},$$
and Rolle's theorem implies that there is $c\in (a,b)$ such that
$$0=g'(c)=-\frac{f(b)-f(a)}{b-a}.$$

Hence, $f(a)=f(b)$ for every $a$ and $b$, and the function $f$ is constant.

=== Requirement for completeness of domain ===
Rolle's theorem relies on the completeness of the real numbers. If the domain is a non-complete densely ordered field, one can exploit the 'holes' in the domain to construct a function that does not obey Rolle's theorem (assuming that the definitions of continuous and differentiable are adjusted for the incomplete ordered domain).

For example, consider $f:\mathbb{Q}\to\mathbb{Q}$, such that for all $x\in\mathbb{Q}$, $f(x)=(x^{2}-2)^{2}$. Then $f$ is continuous on $[0,2]\cap\mathbb{Q}$, differentiable on $(0,2)\cap\mathbb{Q}$, $f(0)=4$ and $f(2)=4$, but there exists no $x\in(0,2)\cap\mathbb{Q}$ such that $f'(x)=0$. In the real numbers, this value would be $\sqrt{2}$, but $\sqrt{2}$ is not in $(0,2)\cap\mathbb{Q}$.

== Generalization ==
The second example illustrates the following generalization of Rolle's theorem:

Consider a real-valued, continuous function f on a closed interval [a, b] with f(a) = f(b). If for every x in the open interval (a, b) the right-hand limit
$$f'(x^+):=\lim_{h \to 0^+}\frac{f(x+h)-f(x)}{h}$$
and the left-hand limit
$$f'(x^-):=\lim_{h \to 0^-}\frac{f(x+h)-f(x)}{h}$$

exist in the extended real line [−∞, ∞], then there is some number c in the open interval (a, b) such that one of the two limits
$$f'(c^+)\quad\text{and}\quad f'(c^-)$$
is ≥ 0 and the other one is ≤ 0 (in the extended real line). If the right- and left-hand limits agree for every x, then they agree in particular for c, hence the derivative of f exists at c and is equal to zero.

=== Remarks ===
- If f is convex or concave, then the right- and left-hand derivatives exist at every inner point, hence the above limits exist and are real numbers.
- This generalized version of the theorem is sufficient to prove convexity when the one-sided derivatives are monotonically increasing:
  $$f'(x^-) \le f'(x^+) \le f'(y^-),\quad x < y.$$

== Proof of the generalized version ==
Since the proof for the standard version of Rolle's theorem and the generalization are very similar, we prove the generalization.

The idea of the proof is to argue that if f(a) = f(b), then f must attain either a maximum or a minimum somewhere between a and b, say at c, and the function must change from increasing to decreasing (or the other way around) at c. In particular, if the derivative exists, it must be zero at c.

By assumption, f is continuous on [a, b], and by the extreme value theorem attains both its maximum and its minimum in [a, b]. If these are both attained at the endpoints of [a, b], then f is constant on [a, b] and so the derivative of f is zero at every point in (a, b).

Suppose then that the maximum is obtained at an interior point c of (a, b) (the argument for the minimum is very similar, just consider −f). We shall examine the above right- and left-hand limits separately.

For a real h such that c + h is in [a, b], the value f(c + h) is smaller or equal to f(c) because f attains its maximum at c. Therefore, for every h > 0,
$$\frac{f(c+h)-f(c)}{h}\le0,$$
hence
$$f'(c^+):=\lim_{h \to 0^+}\frac{f(c+h)-f(c)}{h}\le0,$$
where the limit exists by assumption; it may be minus infinity.

Similarly, for every h < 0, the inequality turns around because the denominator is now negative and we get
$$\frac{f(c+h)-f(c)}{h}\ge0,$$
hence
$$f'(c^-):=\lim_{h \to 0^-}\frac{f(c+h)-f(c)}{h}\ge0,$$
where the limit might be plus infinity.

Finally, when the above right- and left-hand limits agree (in particular when f is differentiable), then the derivative of f at c must be zero.

(Alternatively, we can apply Fermat's stationary point theorem directly.)

== Generalization to higher derivatives ==
We can also generalize Rolle's theorem by requiring that f has more points with equal values and greater regularity. Specifically, suppose that

- the function f is n − 1 times continuously differentiable on the closed interval [a, b] and the nth derivative exists on the open interval (a, b), and
- there are n intervals given by a_{1} < b_{1} ≤ a_{2} < b_{2} ≤ ⋯ ≤ a_{n} < b_{n} in [a, b] such that f(a_{k}) = f(b_{k}) for every k from 1 to n.

Then there is a number c in (a, b) such that the nth derivative of f at c is zero.

The red curve is the graph of function with 3 roots in the interval [−3, 2]. Thus its second derivative (graphed in green) also has a root in the same interval.

The requirements concerning the nth derivative of f can be weakened as in the generalization above, giving the corresponding (possibly weaker) assertions for the right- and left-hand limits defined above with f^{(n − 1)} in place of f.

Particularly, this version of the theorem asserts that if a function differentiable enough times has n roots (so they have the same value, that is 0), then there is an internal point where f^{(n − 1)} vanishes.

=== Proof ===
The proof uses mathematical induction. The case n = 1 is simply the standard version of Rolle's theorem. For n > 1, take as the induction hypothesis that the generalization is true for n − 1. We want to prove it for n. Assume the function f satisfies the hypotheses of the theorem. By the standard version of Rolle's theorem, for every integer k from 1 to n, there exists a c_{k} in the open interval (a_{k}, b_{k}) such that f′(c_{k}) = 0. Hence, the first derivative satisfies the assumptions on the n − 1 closed intervals [c_{1}, c_{2}], …, [c_{n − 1}, c_{n}]. By the induction hypothesis, there is a c such that the (n − 1)st derivative of f′ at c is zero.

== Generalizations to other fields ==
Rolle's theorem is a property of differentiable functions over the real numbers, which are an ordered field. As such, it does not generalize to other fields, but the following corollary does: if a real polynomial factors (has all of its roots) over the real numbers, then its derivative does as well. One may call this property of a field Rolle's property. More general fields do not always have differentiable functions, but they do always have polynomials, which can be symbolically differentiated. Similarly, more general fields may not have an order, but one has a notion of a root of a polynomial lying in a field.

Thus Rolle's theorem shows that the real numbers have Rolle's property. Any algebraically closed field such as the complex numbers has Rolle's property. However, the rational numbers do not – for example, x^{3} − x = x(x − 1)(x + 1) factors over the rationals, but its derivative,
$$3x^2-1 = 3 \left(x - \tfrac{1}{\sqrt 3} \right) \left(x + \tfrac{1}{\sqrt 3} \right),$$
does not. The question of which fields satisfy Rolle's property was raised in Kaplansky 1972. For finite fields, the answer is that only F^{2} and F^{4} have Rolle's property.

For a complex version, see Voorhoeve index.

== See also ==
- Mean value theorem
- Intermediate value theorem
- Linear interpolation
- Gauss–Lucas theorem
