= Voorhoeve index =

In mathematics, the Voorhoeve index is a non-negative real number associated with certain functions on the complex numbers, named after Marc Voorhoeve. It may be used to extend Rolle's theorem from real functions to complex functions, taking the role that for real functions is played by the number of zeros of the function in an interval.

== Definition ==
The Voorhoeve index $V_I(f)$ of a complex-valued function f that is analytic in a complex neighbourhood of the real interval $I$ = [a, b] is given by

$$V_I(f) = \frac{1}{2\pi}\int_a^b \! \left| \frac{d}{dt} {\rm Arg} \, f(t) \right| \,\, dt \, = \frac{1}{2\pi} \int_a^b \! \left| {\rm Im}\left(\frac{f'}{f}\right) \right| \, dt.$$

(Different authors use different normalization factors.)

== Rolle's theorem ==
Rolle's theorem states that if $f$ is a continuously differentiable real-valued function on the real line, and $f(a)=$ $f(b)=0$, where $a<b$, then its derivative $f'$ has a zero strictly between $a$ and $b$. Or, more generally, if $N_I(f)$ denotes the number of zeros of the continuously differentiable function $f$ on the interval $I$, then $N_I(f) \le N_I(f')+1.$

Now one has the analogue of Rolle's theorem:

$$V_I(f) \le V_I (f') + \frac12.$$

This leads to bounds on the number of zeros of an analytic function in a complex region.
