= Marc Voorhoeve =

Dutch mathematician (1950 – 2011)

- Born: 5 April 1950; Amsterdam, Netherlands
- Died: 7 October 2011 (aged 61); Eindhoven, Netherlands
- Education: Leiden University
- Known for: Voorhoeve index
- Scientific career
- Fields: Mathematics
- Workplaces: Eindhoven University of Technology
- Doctoral advisor: Robert Tijdeman

Marc Voorhoeve (5 April 1950, Amsterdam – 7 October 2011, Eindhoven) was a Dutch mathematician who introduced the Voorhoeve index of a complex function in 1976.

== Career ==
Marc studied at the University of Leiden where he wrote a thesis on exponential polynomials. The Voorhoeve index is a result from this work.

He then worked at Centrum Wiskunde & Informatica and at Philips Data Systems, a division of Philips that manufactured minicomputers.

From 1985 to 2011, he was assistant professor in Kees van Hee's group at Eindhoven University of Technology, which specialized in business process modeling techniques based on sound mathematical principles, in particular Petri nets and process algebra.

== Publications ==
- Voorhoeve, Marc (1979), "A lower bound for the permanents of certain (0,1)-matrices", Nederl. Akad. Wetensch. Indag. Math., 82 (1): 83–86, doi:10.1016/1385-7258(79)90012-X

== See also ==
- Petersen's theorem
