= Mean value theorem (divided differences) =

In mathematical analysis, the mean value theorem for divided differences generalizes the mean value theorem to higher derivatives.

== Statement of the theorem ==
For any n + 1 pairwise distinct points x_{0}, ..., x_{n} in the domain of an n-times differentiable function f there exists an interior point

$$\xi \in (\min\{x_0,\dots,x_n\},\max\{x_0,\dots,x_n\}) \,$$

where the nth derivative of f equals n! times the nth divided difference at these points:

$$f[x_0,\dots,x_n] = \frac{f^{(n)}(\xi)}{n!}.$$

For n = 1, that is two function points, one obtains the simple mean value theorem.

== Proof ==
Let $P$ be the Lagrange interpolation polynomial for f at x_{0}, ..., x_{n}. Then it follows from the Newton form of $P$ that the highest order term of $P$ is $f[x_0,\dots,x_n]x^n$.

Let $g$ be the remainder of the interpolation, defined by $g = f - P$. Then $g$ has $n+1$ zeros: x_{0}, ..., x_{n}. By applying Rolle's theorem first to $g$, then to $g'$, and so on until $g^{(n-1)}$, we find that $g^{(n)}$ has a zero $\xi$. This means that

$$0 = g^{(n)}(\xi) = f^{(n)}(\xi) - f[x_0,\dots,x_n] n!$$,
$$f[x_0,\dots,x_n] = \frac{f^{(n)}(\xi)}{n!}.$$

== Applications ==
The theorem can be used to generalise the Stolarsky mean to more than two variables.
