= Uniformly distributed measure =

In mathematics — specifically, in geometric measure theory — a uniformly distributed measure on a metric space is one for which the measure of an open ball depends only on its radius and not on its centre. By convention, the measure is also required to be Borel regular, and to take positive and finite values on open balls of finite radius. Thus, if (X, d) is a metric space, a Borel regular measure μ on X is said to be uniformly distributed if

$$0 < \mu(\mathbf{B}_{r}(x)) = \mu(\mathbf{B}_{r}(y)) < + \infty$$

for all points x and y of X and all 0 < r < +∞, where

$$\mathbf{B}_{r}(x) := \{ z \in X | d(x, z) < r \}.$$

== Christensen's lemma ==
As it turns out, uniformly distributed measures are very rigid objects. On any "decent" metric space, the uniformly distributed measures form a one-parameter linearly dependent family:

Let μ and ν be uniformly distributed Borel regular measures on a separable metric space (X, d). Then there is a constant c such that μ = cν.
