= Logarithmic mean =

Difference of two numbers divided by the logarithm of their quotient

In mathematics, the logarithmic mean is a function of two non-negative numbers which is equal to their difference divided by the logarithm of their quotient. This calculation is applicable in engineering problems involving heat and mass transfer.

== Definition ==
The logarithmic mean is defined by

$$L(x, y)
=
\left \{ \begin{array}{l l}
x, & \text{if }x = y,\\
\dfrac{x - y}{\ln x - \ln y}, & \text{otherwise},
\end{array}
\right .$$

for $x, y \in \mathbb{R}$, such that $x, y > 0$.

== Inequalities ==
The logarithmic mean of two numbers is smaller than the arithmetic mean and the generalized mean with exponent greater than 1. However, it is larger than the geometric mean and the harmonic mean, respectively. The inequalities are strict unless both numbers are equal. More precisely, for $p, x, y \in \mathbb{R}$ with $x \neq y$ and $p > 1$, we have
$$\frac{2xy}{x + y}
<
\sqrt{x y}
<
\frac{x  - y}{\ln x - \ln y}
<
\frac{x + y}{2}
<
\left(\frac{x^p + y^p}2\right)^{1/p},$$
where the expressions in the chain of inequalities are, in order: the harmonic mean, the geometric mean, the logarithmic mean, the arithmetic mean, and the generalized arithmetic mean with exponent $p$.

== Derivation ==
=== Mean value theorem of differential calculus ===
From the mean value theorem, there exists a value ξ in the interval between x and y where the derivative f ′ equals the slope of the secant line:
$$\exists \xi \in (x, y): \ f'(\xi) = \frac{f(x) - f(y)}{x - y}$$

The logarithmic mean is obtained as the value of ξ by substituting ln for f and similarly for its corresponding derivative:
$$\frac{1}{\xi} = \frac{\ln x - \ln y}{x-y}$$

and solving for ξ:
$$\xi = \frac{x-y}{\ln x - \ln y}$$

=== Integration ===
The logarithmic mean is also given by the integral
$$L(x, y) = \int_0^1 x^{1-t} y^t\,\mathrm{d}t.$$

This interpretation allows the derivation of some properties of the logarithmic mean. Since the exponential function is monotonic, the integral over an interval of length 1 is bounded by x and y.

Two other useful integral representations are
$${1 \over L(x,y)} = \int_0^1 {\operatorname{d}\!t \over t x + (1-t)y}$$
and
$${1 \over L(x,y)} = \int_0^\infty {\operatorname{d}\!t \over (t+x)\,(t+y)}.$$

== Generalization ==
=== Mean value theorem of differential calculus ===
One can generalize the mean to n + 1 variables by considering the mean value theorem for divided differences for the n-th derivative of the logarithm.

We obtain
$$L_\text{MV}(x_0,\, \dots,\, x_n) = \sqrt[-n]{(-1)^{n+1} n \ln\left(\left[x_0,\, \dots,\, x_n\right]\right)}$$
where $\ln\left(\left[x_0,\, \dots,\, x_n\right]\right)$ denotes a divided difference of the logarithm. For n = 2 this leads to
$$L_\text{MV}(x, y, z) = \sqrt{\frac{(x-y)(y-z)(z-x)}{2 \bigl((y-z) \ln x + (z-x) \ln y + (x-y) \ln z \bigr)}}.$$

=== Integral ===
The integral interpretation can also be generalized to more variables, but it leads to a different result. Given the simplex $S$ with
$$S = \{\left(\alpha_0,\dots,\alpha_n\right) \in \mathbb{R}^{n + 1}\,;\, \alpha_0 + \dots + \alpha_n = 1 \text{ and } \alpha_j \ge 0, \text{ for } j = 0, \dots, n\}$$
and an appropriate measure $\mathrm{d}\alpha$ which assigns the simplex a volume of 1, we obtain
$$L_\text{I}\left(x_0,\dots,x_n\right) = \int_S x_0^{\alpha_0} \cdots x_n^{\alpha_n}\,\mathrm{d}\alpha.$$

This can be expressed as the divided differences of the exponential function by
$$L_\text{I}\left(x_0,\dots,x_n\right) = n! \exp\left[\ln\left(x_0\right), \dots, \ln\left(x_n\right)\right].$$
In the case of n = 2, it is
$$L_\text{I}(x, y, z) = -2 \frac{x(\ln y - \ln z) + y(\ln z - \ln x) + z(\ln x - \ln y)}
{(\ln x - \ln y)(\ln y - \ln z)(\ln z - \ln x)}.$$

== Connection to other means ==
Some other means can be expressed in terms of the logarithmic mean.

Other means expressed in terms of the logarithmic mean
Name	Mean	Expression
Arithmetic mean	$\frac{x + y}{2}$	$\frac{L\left(x^2, y^2\right)}{L(x, y)}$
Geometric mean	$\sqrt{x y}$	$\sqrt{\frac{L\left(x, y\right)}{L\left( \frac{1}{x}, \frac{1}{y} \right)}}$
Harmonic mean	$\frac{2}{\frac{1}{x}+\frac{1}{y}}$	$\frac{ L\left( \frac{1}{x}, \frac{1}{y} \right) }{L\left( \frac{1}{x^2}, \frac{1}{y^2} \right)}$

== See also ==
- The logarithmic mean is a special case of the Stolarsky mean.
- Logarithmic mean temperature difference
- Log semiring
