= Cubic mean =

Cubic root of the mean of the cubes

The cubic mean (written as $\bar{x}_\mathrm{cubic}$) is a specific instance of the generalized mean with $p=3$.

== Definition ==
For $n$ real numbers $x_i \in \mathbb R$ the cubic mean is defined as:

$\bar{x}_\mathrm{cubic} = \sqrt[3]{\frac{1}{n}\sum_{i=1}^n{x_i^3}} = \sqrt[3]{{x_1^3 + x_2^3 + \cdots + x_n^3} \over n}.$

For example, the cubic mean of two numbers is:

$$\sqrt[3]{\frac{x_1^3+x_2^3}{2}}$$.

== Applications ==
The cubic mean is used to predict the life expectancy of machine parts.

The cubic mean wind speed has been used a measure of local potential for wind energy.

The cubic mean is also used in biology to measure the mean dimensions of spherical bacteria (cocci) and of larger animals that are approximately spheroidal in shape. In this case using the conventional arithmetic mean will not give an accurate result because the size of a spherical bacterium increases as the cube of the radius.
