= Stolarsky mean =

In mathematics, the Stolarsky mean is a mean that generalizes the logarithmic mean. It was introduced by Kenneth B. Stolarsky in 1975.

== Definition ==
For two positive real numbers $x$ and $y$, the Stolarsky mean is defined as:

$$S_p(x,y)
=
\left \{
\begin{array}{l l}
x, & \text{if }x=y, \\
\left({\frac{x^p-y^p}{p (x-y)}}\right)^{1/(p-1)}, & \text{otherwise}.
\end{array}
\right .$$

== Derivation ==
It is derived from the mean value theorem, which states that a secant line, cutting the graph of a differentiable function $f$ at $( x, f(x) )$ and $( y, f(y) )$, has the same slope as a line tangent to the graph at some point $\xi$ in the interval $[x,y]$.

$$\exists \xi\in[x,y]\ f'(\xi) = \frac{f(x)-f(y)}{x-y}$$

The Stolarsky mean is obtained by

$$\xi = \left[f'\right]^{-1}\left(\frac{f(x)-f(y)}{x-y}\right)$$

when choosing $f(x) = x^p$.

== Special cases ==
- $\lim_{p\to -\infty} S_p(x,y)$ is the minimum.
- $S_{-1}(x,y)$ is the geometric mean.
- $\lim_{p\to 0} S_p(x,y)$ is the logarithmic mean. It can be obtained from the mean value theorem by choosing $f(x) = \ln x$.
- $S_{\frac{1}{2}}(x,y)$ is the power mean with exponent $\frac{1}{2}$.
- $\lim_{p\to 1} S_p(x,y)$ is the identric mean. It can be obtained from the mean value theorem by choosing $f(x) = x\cdot \ln x$.
- $S_2(x,y)$ is the arithmetic mean.
- $S_3(x,y) = QM(x,y,GM(x,y))$ is a connection to the quadratic mean and the geometric mean.
- $\lim_{p\to\infty} S_p(x,y)$ is the maximum.

== Generalizations ==
=== Additional parameters ===
- The standard two-parameter version extends the one-parameter case with $\alpha = p,\ \beta = 1$:
  $$S_{\alpha,\beta}(x,y)
=
\left \{
\begin{array}{l l}
x, & \text{if }x=y, \\
\left({\frac{\beta(x^\alpha-y^\alpha)}{\alpha (x^\beta-y^\beta)}}\right)^{1/(\alpha-\beta)}, & \text{otherwise}.
\end{array}
\right .$$
  (Note that the names of the parameters can vary, and some authors reverse their order.) This extra parameter allows for additional special cases; e.g.:
  - The rth power mean has α = r and β = 2r.
  - The harmonic mean has α = -2 and β = -1.
- This can be generalized further to have any number of pairs of parameters $a_1, \dots, a_k, b_1, \dots, b_k$ (where Σb = 0?) by making the result $\left(\frac{x^{a_1} - y^{a_1}}{a_1}\right)^{b_1} \times \cdots \times \left(\frac{x^{a_k} - y^{a_k}}{a_k}\right)^{b_k}$. The two-parameter case results from $a_1 = \alpha,\ a_2 = \beta,\ b_1 = \frac{1}{\alpha - \beta},\ b_2 = \frac{1}{\beta - \alpha}$.

=== More than two variables ===
There are various different approaches for extending the mean to n variables, such as:

- The x-value where the n-1st derivative equals the divided difference (a generalization of slope) of the values on the pth-degree monic power function: using the mean value theorem for divided differences, $S_p(x_1,\dots,x_n) = {f^{(n-1)}}^{-1}((n-1)!\cdot f[x_1,\dots,x_n])$ where $f(x)=x^p$, or for the two-parameter version, c such that $\frac{g[x_1, \dots, x_n]}{f[x_1, \dots, x_n]} = \frac{g^{(n)}(c)}{f^{(n)}(c)}$ where $f(x)=x^\beta$ and $g(x)=x^\alpha$, using ln(x) to replace zero divided by zero if α or β is in $\mathbb{Z} \cap [0, n)$.
- $\left(\int \left(\sum_{i=1}^n u_i x_i^\beta \right)^{\frac{\alpha-\beta}{\beta}} \mathrm{d}\mathbf{u}\right)^{\frac{1}{\alpha-\beta}}$, where the integral is over a Dirichlet measure, and if it is flat (all concentration parameters equal 1), this is equal to $\left( \left(\sum_{i=1}^{n} \frac{x_i^{\alpha+(n-2)\beta}}{\prod_{j \in \mathbb{Z}\cap[1, n]\backslash\{i\}}(x_i^\beta - x_j^\beta)}\right) \prod_{i=2}^{n} \frac{(i-1) \beta}{\alpha + (i - 2) \beta} \right)^{\frac{1}{\alpha - \beta}}$.
- Based on a ratio of logarithmic means (for a particular way of extending it): $\left[(\beta/\alpha)^{n-1} \frac{\sum_{i=1}^n x_i^\alpha / \prod_{j \in \mathbb{Z}\cap[1, n]\backslash\{i\}}(\ln(x_i)-\ln(x_j))}{\sum_{i=1}^n x_i^\beta / \prod_{j \in \mathbb{Z}\cap[1, n]\backslash\{i\}}(\ln(x_i)-\ln(x_j))}\right]^\frac{1}{\alpha-\beta}$.
- $\left( \left(\frac{\beta}{\alpha}\right)^2 \frac{\left(\sum_{i=1}^n p_i x_i^{2\alpha} \right) - {\prod_{i=1}^n x_i^{p_i}}^{2\alpha}}{\left(\sum_{i=1}^n p_i x_i^{2\beta} \right) - {\prod_{i=1}^n x_i^{p_i}}^{2\beta}} \right)^{\frac{1}{2\alpha-2\beta}}$ where the standard two-variable case has p_{1} = p_{2} = 1/2.
