= Calculating device =

Calculating device may stand for:

- Calculator, a portable electronic device used to perform calculations
- Slide rule, a graphical analog calculator, related to the nomogram
