= Claudia Alexander =

American geophysicist and planetary scientist

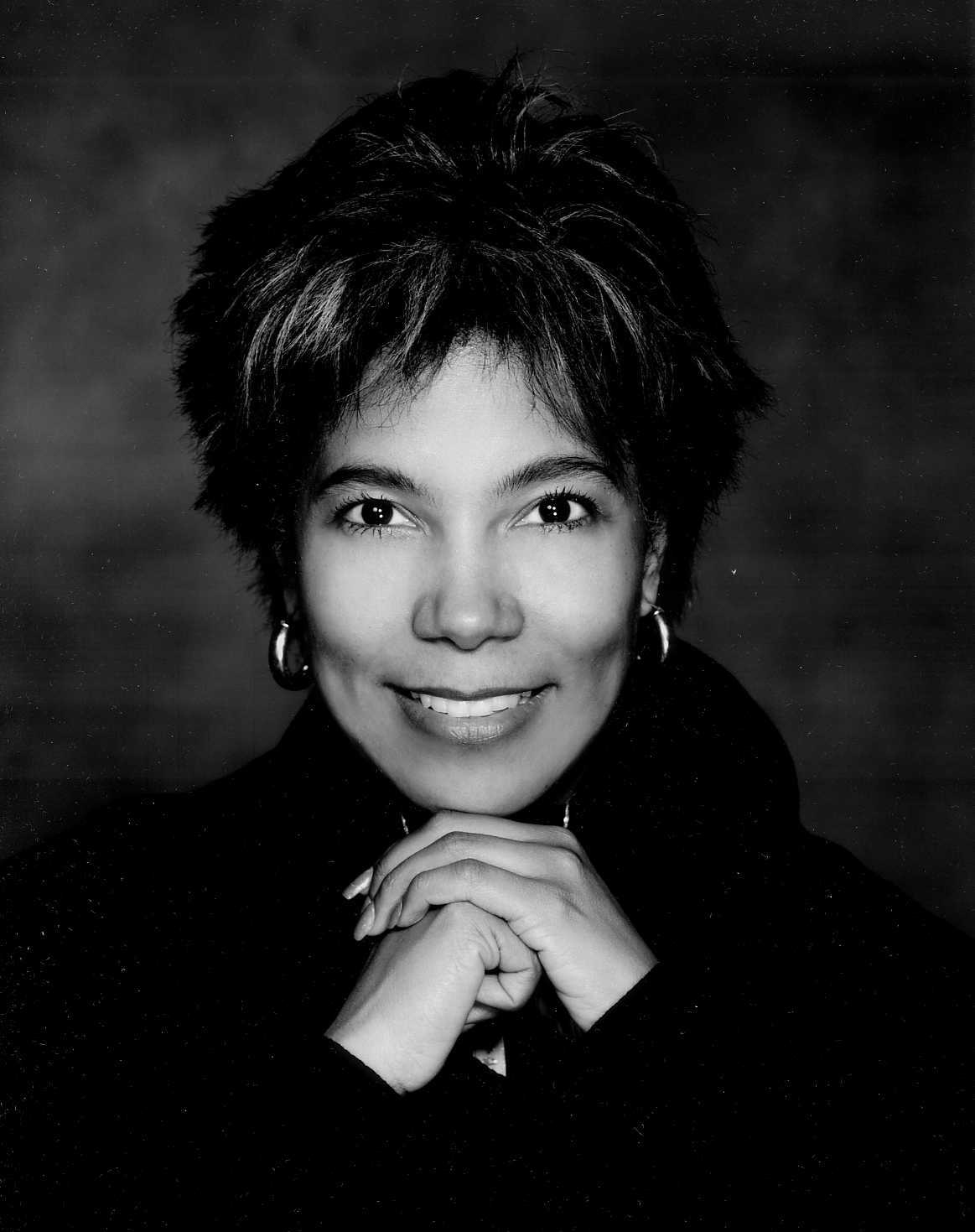
- Born: May 30, 1959; Vancouver, British Columbia, Canada
- Died: July 11, 2015 (aged 56); Arcadia, California, United States
- Education: UC Berkeley, UCLA, University of Michigan
- Scientific career
- Fields: Planetary science
- Institutions: U.S. Geological Survey, Jet Propulsion Lab
- Doctoral advisor: Tamas Gombosi

Claudia Joan Alexander (May 30, 1959 – July 11, 2015) was a Canadian-born American research scientist specializing in geophysics and planetary science. She worked for the United States Geological Survey and NASA's Jet Propulsion Laboratory. She was the last project manager of NASA's Galileo mission to Jupiter and until the time of her death had served as project manager and scientist of NASA's role in the European-led Rosetta mission to study Comet Churyumov–Gerasimenko.

== Early life ==
Alexander was born in Vancouver, British Columbia, Canada. Her mother was Gaynelle Justena Williams Alexander (1929-2017), a corporate librarian for Intel; her father was Harold Alfred Alexander (1917-2010), a social worker. Alexander's siblings are Suzanne and David. Alexander was raised by her mother in Santa Clara, California.

Alexander wanted to be a journalist but her parents—who were paying for her education—wanted her to become an engineer. After a summer job at the Ames Research Center, she became interested in planetary science. Although she had been hired to work in the engineering section, she would sneak off to the science section where she found that not only was she good at the work, but that it was easier and more enjoyable to her than she had expected.

== Education ==
In 1983, Alexander received a Bachelor's degree from the University of California, Berkeley in geophysics, which she thought would be a good background for a planetary scientist. Alexander earned her Master's from the University of California, Los Angeles in geophysics and space physics in 1985. Her masters' thesis used Pioneer Venus Orbiter data to study solar cycle variations in extreme ultraviolet radiation of the Venus ionosphere and its interaction with the solar wind. She earned her Ph.D. in Atmospheric, Oceanic and Space Sciences, specializing in the physics of space plasma, from the University of Michigan in 1993.

== Career ==
Alexander worked at the United States Geological Survey studying plate tectonics and at the Ames Research Center observing Jovian moons, before moving to NASA's Jet Propulsion Laboratory in 1986, where she worked for 30 years. She worked as science coordinator for the plasma wave instrument aboard the Galileo spacecraft before becoming the project manager of the mission in its final phase. The mission discovered 21 new moons of Jupiter and the presence of an atmosphere on Ganymede. The discovery of the atmosphere, more precisely a "surface bound exosphere", caused scientists to rethink their assumptions that Ganymede was an inactive moon. She was the final project manager for the mission, and oversaw the spacecraft's dive into Jupiter's atmosphere at the mission's conclusion in 2003.

Alexander worked as a researcher on diverse topics, including the evolution and interior physics of comets, Jupiter and its moons, planetary magnetospheres, plate tectonics, space plasma, the discontinuities and expansion of solar wind, and the planet Venus. She also worked with the project team as a science coordinator on the Cassini mission to Saturn. She wrote and co-authored 14 papers.

She was a strong advocate for women and minorities in the STEM fields and a passionate science communicator. Alexander worked a lot with young women at the University of Michigan, helping them finish their studies. She was considered a role model for many women of colour in stem, encouraging them to attend higher education. In April 2015, she presented a TEDx talk at Columbia College Chicago, "The Compelling Nature of Locomotion and the Strange Case of Childhood Education", describing her approach for educating children about science. She also mentored young people, particularly young girls of color, to encourage their passions for science.

From 2000 until the time of her death, Alexander served as project scientist of NASA's role in Rosetta, the European Space Agency mission to study and land on comet 67P/Churyumov-Gerasimenko. On the mission she was responsible for $35 million in instrumentation, collecting data such as temperature from three instruments on the orbiter. She also oversaw tracking and navigation support from the NASA's Deep Space Network for the spacecraft.

== Personal life ==
In addition to her scientific work, Alexander had a passion for writing. She wrote children's books, including some of the "Windows to Adventure" series, Which of the Mountains Is Greatest of All? and Windows to the Morning Star. She also wrote science fiction and was a member of the Romance Writers of America. She used her writing skills to contribute to another of her passions, tennis, writing for the Bleacher Report tennis blog. She also enjoyed traveling and horseback riding.

On July 11, 2015, Alexander died in Arcadia, California after a ten-year battle with breast cancer. She was laid to rest at Oak Hill Memorial Park in San Jose, California. She was 56 years old when she died.

== Awards and honors ==
The year of her graduation from the University of Michigan she was named "U-M Woman of the Year in Human Relations", and she was among the first 20 African Americans students to graduate with a PhD in astronomy-physics. In 2002 she earned the Atmospheric, Oceanic and Space Sciences Alumni Merit Award, and she also was a member of their National Advisory Board.

In 2003, Alexander was awarded the Emerald Honor for Women of Color in Research & Engineering by Career Communications Group, Inc.—publisher of Black Engineer & Information Technology Magazine—at the National Women of Color Research Sciences and Technology Conference.

The Claudia Alexander Scholarship was established for undergraduate students at her alma mater in 2007 by her uncle, Jiles Williams. The scholarship supports need-based students majoring in climate and space sciences and engineering in the University of Michigan's college of engineering.

Alexander was a member of the American Geophysical Union—where she served as chair of the diversity subcommittee. In American Geophysical Union (AUG), she focused on education and diversity in earth and space sciences. She also served in the Association for Women Geoscientists, where she was named "Woman of the Year".

In 2015 scientists from the European Space Agency's Rosetta mission honored their deceased colleague by naming a feature after her on the mission's target, comet 67P/Churyumov-Gerasimenko. A gate-like feature on the comet has been named C. Alexander Gate.

The University of Michigan Women in Science and Engineering office gives an annual award in her honor: the Claudia Joan Alexander Trailblazer Award for groundbreaking accomplishments and contributions to STEM. In 2020, the American Astronomical Society's Division for Planetary Sciences introduced the Claudia J. Alexander Prize awarded to scientists who have significantly advanced the field.

Not long after her death, the Miles From Tomorrowland episodes "A Growing Problem" and "The Tardigrade Escapade" were released in her memory.

== See also ==
- Timeline of women in science
