= Heptagonal triangle =

Obtuse triangle formed by the side and diagonals of a regular heptagon

Regular heptagon Longer diagonals Shorter diagonals Each of the fourteen congruent heptagonal triangles has one green side, one blue side, and one red side.

In Euclidean geometry, a heptagonal triangle is an obtuse, scalene triangle whose vertices coincide with the first, second, and fourth vertices of a regular heptagon (from an arbitrary starting vertex). Thus its sides coincide with one side and the adjacent shorter and longer diagonals of the regular heptagon. All heptagonal triangles are similar (have the same shape), and so they are collectively known as the heptagonal triangle. Its angles have measures $\pi/7, 2\pi/7,$ and $4\pi/7,$ and it is the only triangle with angles in the ratios 1:2:4. The heptagonal triangle has various remarkable properties.

== Key points ==
The heptagonal triangle's nine-point center is also its first Brocard point.

The second Brocard point lies on the nine-point circle.

The circumcenter and the Fermat points of a heptagonal triangle form an equilateral triangle.

The distance between the circumcenter O and the orthocenter H is given by

$$OH=R\sqrt{2},$$

where R is the circumradius. The squared distance from the incenter I to the orthocenter is

$$IH^2=\frac{R^2+4r^2}{2},$$

where r is the inradius.

The two tangents from the orthocenter to the circumcircle are mutually perpendicular.

== Relations of distances ==
=== Sides ===
The heptagonal triangle's sides a < b < c coincide respectively with the regular heptagon's side, shorter diagonal, and longer diagonal. They satisfy

$$\begin{align}
a^2 & =c(c-b), \\[5pt]
b^2 & =a(c+a), \\[5pt]
c^2 & =b(a+b), \\[5pt]
\frac 1 a & =\frac 1 b + \frac 1 c
\end{align}$$

(the latter being the optic equation) and hence

$$ab+ac=bc,$$

and

$$b^3+2b^2c-bc^2-c^3=0,$$
$$c^3-2c^2a-ca^2+a^3=0,$$
$$a^3-2a^2b-ab^2+b^3=0.$$

Thus –b/c, c/a, and a/b all satisfy the cubic equation

$$t^3-2t^2-t + 1=0.$$

However, no algebraic expressions with purely real terms exist for the solutions of this equation, because it is an example of casus irreducibilis.

The approximate relation of the sides is

$$b\approx 1.80193\cdot a, \qquad c\approx 2.24698\cdot a.$$

We also have

$$\frac{a^2}{bc}, \quad -\frac{b^2}{ca}, \quad -\frac{c^2}{ab}$$

satisfy the cubic equation

$$t^3+4t^2+3t-1=0.$$

We also have

$$\frac{a^3}{bc^2}, \quad -\frac{b^3}{ca^2}, \quad \frac{c^3}{ab^2}$$

satisfy the cubic equation

$$t^3-t^2-9t+1=0.$$

We also have

$$\frac{a^3}{b^2c}, \quad \frac{b^3}{c^2a}, \quad -\frac{c^3}{a^2b}$$

satisfy the cubic equation

$$t^3+5t^2-8t+1=0.$$

We also have

$$b^2-a^2=ac,$$

$$c^2-b^2=ab,$$

$$a^2-c^2=-bc,$$

and

$$\frac{b^2}{a^2}+\frac{c^2}{b^2}+\frac{a^2}{c^2}=5.$$

We also have

$$ab-bc+ca=0,$$
$$a^{3}b-b^{3}c+c^{3}a=0,$$
$$a^{4}b+b^{4}c-c^{4}a=0,$$
$$a^{11}b^{3}-b^{11}c^{3}+c^{11}a^{3}=0.$$

=== Altitudes ===
The altitudes h_{a}, h_{b}, and h_{c} satisfy

$h_a=h_b+h_c$

and

$h_a^2+h_b^2+h_c^2=\frac{a^2+b^2+c^2}{2}.$

The altitude from side b (opposite angle B) is half the internal angle bisector $w_A$ of A:

$$2h_b=w_A.$$

Here angle A is the smallest angle, and B is the second smallest.

=== Internal angle bisectors ===
We have these properties of the internal angle bisectors $w_A, w_B,$ and $w_C$ of angles A, B, and C respectively:

$$w_A=b+c,$$

$$w_B=c-a,$$

$$w_C=b-a.$$

=== Circumradius, inradius, and exradius ===
The triangle's area is

$$A=\frac{\sqrt{7}}{4}R^2,$$

where R is the triangle's circumradius.

We have

$$a^2+b^2+c^2=7R^2.$$

We also have

$$a^4+b^4+c^4=21R^4.$$
$$a^6+b^6+c^6=70R^6.$$

The ratio r /R of the inradius to the circumradius is the positive solution of the cubic equation

$$8x^3+28x^2+14x-7=0.$$

In addition,

$$\frac{1}{a^2}+\frac{1}{b^2}+\frac{1}{c^2}=\frac{2}{R^2}.$$

We also have

$$\frac{1}{a^4}+\frac{1}{b^4}+\frac{1}{c^4}=\frac{2}{R^4}.$$
$$\frac{1}{a^6}+\frac{1}{b^6}+\frac{1}{c^6}=\frac{17}{7R^6}.$$

In general for all integer n,

$$a^{2n}+b^{2n}+c^{2n}=g(n)(2R)^{2n}$$

where

$$g(-1) = 8,  \quad g(0)=3, \quad g(1)=7$$

and

$$g(n)=7g(n-1)-14g(n-2)+7g(n-3).$$

We also have

$$2b^2-a^2=\sqrt{7}bR,  \quad
2c^2-b^2=\sqrt{7}cR,  \quad
2a^2-c^2=-\sqrt{7}aR.$$

We also have

$$a^{3}c + b^{3}a - c^{3}b = -7R^{4},$$
$$a^{4}c - b^{4}a + c^{4}b = 7\sqrt{7}R^{5},$$
$$a^{11}c^{3}+b^{11}a^{3} - c^{11}b^{3}  = -7^{3}17R^{14}.$$

The exradius r_{a} corresponding to side a equals the radius of the nine-point circle of the heptagonal triangle.

== Orthic triangle ==
The heptagonal triangle's orthic triangle, with vertices at the feet of the altitudes, is similar to the heptagonal triangle, with similarity ratio 1:2. The heptagonal triangle is the only obtuse triangle that is similar to its orthic triangle (the equilateral triangle being the only acute one).

== Hyperbola ==
The rectangular hyperbola through $A,B,C,G=X(2),H=X(4)$ has the following properties:

- first focus $F_1 = X(5)$
- center $U$ is on Euler circle (general property) and on circle $(O, F_1)$
- second focus $F_2$ is on the circumcircle

== Trigonometric properties ==
=== Trigonometric identities ===
The various trigonometric identities associated with the heptagonal triangle include these:

$$\begin{align}
A &= \frac{\pi}{7} \\[6pt]
\cos A &= \frac{b}{2a} \end{align}
\quad\begin{align}
B &= \frac{2\pi}{7} \\[6pt]
\cos B &= \frac{c}{2b} \end{align}
\quad\begin{align}
C &= \frac{4\pi}{7} \\[6pt]
\cos C &= -\frac{a}{2c}
\end{align}$$

$$\begin{array}{rcccccl}
\sin A  \!&\! \times \!&\!  \sin B  \!&\! \times \!&\!  \sin C  \!&\! = \!&\!  \frac{\sqrt{7}}{8} \\[2pt]
\sin A  \!&\! - \!&\!  \sin B  \!&\! - \!&\!  \sin C  \!&\! = \!&\!  -\frac{\sqrt{7}}{2} \\[2pt]
\cos A  \!&\! \times \!&\!  \cos B  \!&\! \times \!&\!  \cos C  \!&\! = \!&\!  -\frac{1}{8} \\[2pt]
\tan A  \!&\! \times \!&\!  \tan B  \!&\! \times \!&\!  \tan C  \!&\! = \!&\!  -\sqrt{7} \\[2pt]
\tan A  \!&\! + \!&\!  \tan B  \!&\! + \!&\!  \tan C  \!&\! = \!&\!  -\sqrt{7} \\[2pt]
\cot A  \!&\! + \!&\!  \cot B  \!&\! + \!&\!  \cot C  \!&\! = \!&\!  \sqrt{7} \\[8pt]
\sin^2\!A  \!&\! \times \!&\!  \sin^2\!B  \!&\! \times \!&\!  \sin^2\!C  \!&\! = \!&\!  \frac{7}{64} \\[2pt]
\sin^2\!A  \!&\! + \!&\!  \sin^2\!B  \!&\! + \!&\!  \sin^2\!C  \!&\! = \!&\!  \frac{7}{4} \\[2pt]
\cos^2\!A  \!&\! + \!&\!  \cos^2\!B  \!&\! + \!&\!  \cos^2\!C  \!&\! = \!&\!  \frac{5}{4} \\[2pt]
\tan^2\!A  \!&\! + \!&\!  \tan^2\!B  \!&\! + \!&\!  \tan^2\!C  \!&\! = \!&\!  21 \\[2pt]
\sec^2\!A  \!&\! + \!&\!  \sec^2\!B  \!&\! + \!&\!  \sec^2\!C  \!&\! = \!&\!  24 \\[2pt]
\csc^2\!A  \!&\! + \!&\!  \csc^2\!B  \!&\! + \!&\!  \csc^2\!C  \!&\! = \!&\!  8 \\[2pt]
\cot^2\!A  \!&\! + \!&\!  \cot^2\!B  \!&\! + \!&\!  \cot^2\!C  \!&\! = \!&\!  5 \\[8pt]
\sin^4\!A  \!&\! + \!&\!  \sin^4\!B  \!&\! + \!&\!  \sin^4\!C  \!&\! = \!&\!  \frac{21}{16} \\[2pt]
\cos^4\!A  \!&\! + \!&\!  \cos^4\!B  \!&\! + \!&\!  \cos^4\!C  \!&\! = \!&\!  \frac{13}{16} \\[2pt]
\sec^4\!A  \!&\! + \!&\!  \sec^4\!B  \!&\! + \!&\!  \sec^4\!C  \!&\! = \!&\!  416 \\[2pt]
\csc^4\!A  \!&\! + \!&\!  \csc^4\!B  \!&\! + \!&\!  \csc^4\!C  \!&\! = \!&\!  32 \\[8pt]
\end{array}$$

$$\begin{array}{ccccl}
\tan A \!&\! - \!&\! 4\sin B  \!&\! = \!&\! -\sqrt{7} \\[2pt]
\tan B \!&\! - \!&\! 4\sin C  \!&\! = \!&\! -\sqrt{7} \\[2pt]
\tan C \!&\! + \!&\! 4\sin A  \!&\! = \!&\! -\sqrt{7}
\end{array}$$

$$\begin{align}
\cot^2\! A &= 1 -\frac{2 \tan C}{\sqrt{7}} \\[2pt]
\cot^2\! B &= 1 -\frac{2 \tan A}{\sqrt{7}} \\[2pt]
\cot^2\! C &= 1 -\frac{2 \tan B}{\sqrt{7}}
\end{align}$$

$$\begin{array}{rcccccl}
\cos A  \!&\! = \!&\!  \frac{-1}{2}  \!&\! + \!&\!  \frac{4}{\sqrt{7}}  \!&\! \times \!&\!  \sin^3\! C \\[2pt]
\sec A  \!&\! = \!&\!  2  \!&\! + \!&\!  4  \!&\! \times \!&\!  \cos C \\[4pt]
\sec A  \!&\! = \!&\!  6  \!&\! - \!&\!  8  \!&\! \times \!&\!  \sin^2\! B \\[4pt]
\sec A  \!&\! = \!&\!  4  \!&\! - \!&\!  \frac{16}{\sqrt{7}}  \!&\! \times \!&\!  \sin^3\! B \\[2pt]
\cot A  \!&\! = \!&\!  \sqrt{7}  \!&\! + \!&\!  \frac{8}{\sqrt{7}}  \!&\! \times \!&\!  \sin^2\! B \\[2pt]
\cot A  \!&\! = \!&\!  \frac{3}{\sqrt{7}}  \!&\! + \!&\!  \frac{4}{\sqrt{7}}  \!&\! \times \!&\!  \cos B \\[2pt]
\sin^2\! A  \!&\! = \!&\!  \frac{1}{2}  \!&\! + \!&\!  \frac{1}{2}  \!&\! \times \!&\!  \cos B \\[2pt]
\cos^2\! A  \!&\! = \!&\!  \frac{3}{4}  \!&\! + \!&\!  \frac{2}{\sqrt{7}}  \!&\! \times \!&\!  \sin^3\! A \\[2pt]
\cot^2\! A  \!&\! = \!&\!  3  \!&\! + \!&\!  \frac{8}{\sqrt{7}}  \!&\! \times \!&\!  \sin A \\[2pt]
\sin^3\! A  \!&\! = \!&\!  \frac{-\sqrt{7}}{8}  \!&\! + \!&\!  \frac{\sqrt{7}}{4}  \!&\! \times \!&\!  \cos B \\[2pt]
\csc^3\! A  \!&\! = \!&\!  \frac{-6}{\sqrt{7}}  \!&\! + \!&\!  \frac{2}{\sqrt{7}}  \!&\! \times \!&\!  \tan^2\! C
\end{array}$$

$$\sin A\sin B - \sin B\sin C + \sin C\sin A = 0$$
$$\begin{align}
\sin^3\!B\sin C - \sin^3\!C\sin A - \sin^3\!A\sin B &= 0 \\[3pt]
\sin B\sin^3\!C - \sin C\sin^3\!A - \sin A\sin^3\!B &= \frac{7}{2^4\!} \\[2pt]
\sin^4\!B\sin C - \sin^4\!C\sin A + \sin^4\!A\sin B &= 0 \\[2pt]
\sin B\sin^4\!C + \sin C\sin^4\!A - \sin A\sin^4\!B &= \frac{7\sqrt{7}}{2^{5}}
\end{align}$$
$$\begin{align}
\sin^{11}\!B\sin^3\!C - \sin^{11}\!C\sin^3\!A - \sin^{11}\!A\sin^3\!B &= 0 \\[2pt]
\sin^3\!B\sin^{11}\!C - \sin^3\!C\sin^{11}\!A - \sin^3\!A\sin^{11}\!B &= \frac{7^3\cdot17}{2^{14}}
\end{align}$$

=== Cubic polynomials ===
The cubic equation $64y^3-112y^2+56y-7=0$ has solutions $\sin^2\! A,\ \sin^2\! B,\ \sin^2\! C.$

The positive solution of the cubic equation $x^3+x^2-2x-1=0$ equals $2\cos B.$

The roots of the cubic equation $x^3 - \tfrac{\sqrt 7}{2}x^2 + \tfrac{\sqrt 7}{8} = 0$ are $\sin 2A,\ \sin 2B,\ \sin 2C.$

The roots of the cubic equation $x^3 - \tfrac{\sqrt 7}{2} x^2 + \tfrac{\sqrt 7}{8} = 0$ are $-\sin A,\ \sin B,\ \sin C.$

The roots of the cubic equation $x^3 + \tfrac{1}{2}x^2 - \tfrac{1}{2}x - \tfrac{1}{8} = 0$ are $-\cos A,\ \cos B,\ \cos C.$

The roots of the cubic equation $x^3 + \sqrt{7}x^2 - 7x + \sqrt{7} = 0$ are $\tan A,\ \tan B,\ \tan C.$

The roots of the cubic equation $x^3 - 21x^2 + 35x - 7 = 0$ are $\tan^2\! A,\ \tan^2\! B,\ \tan^2\! C.$

=== Sequences ===
For an integer n, let
$$\begin{align}
S(n) &= (-\sin A)^n + \sin^n\! B + \sin^n\! C \\[4pt]
C(n) &= (-\cos A)^n + \cos^n\! B + \cos^n\! C \\[4pt]
T(n) &= \tan^n\! A + \tan^n\! B + \tan^n\! C
\end{align}$$

Value of n:	0	1	2	3	4	5	6	7	8	9	10	11	12	13	14	15	16	17	18	19	20
$S(n)$	$\ 3\$	$\tfrac{\sqrt 7}{2}$	$\tfrac{7}{2^2}$	$\tfrac{\sqrt 7}{2}$	$\tfrac{7\cdot3}{2^4}$	$\tfrac{7\sqrt 7}{2^4}$	$\tfrac{7\cdot5}{2^5}$	$\tfrac{7^2\sqrt 7}{2^7}$	$\tfrac{7^2\cdot5}{2^8}$	$\tfrac{7\cdot25\sqrt 7}{2^9}$	$\tfrac{7^2\cdot9}{2^9}$	$\tfrac{7^2\cdot13\sqrt 7}{2^{11}}$	$\tfrac{7^2\cdot33}{2^{11}}$	$\tfrac{7^2\cdot3\sqrt 7}{2^9}$	$\tfrac{7^4\cdot5}{2^{14}}$	$\tfrac{7^2\cdot179\sqrt 7}{2^{15}}$	$\tfrac{7^3\cdot131}{2^{16}}$	$\tfrac{7^3\cdot3\sqrt 7}{2^{12}}$	$\tfrac{7^3\cdot493}{2^{18}}$	$\tfrac{7^3\cdot181\sqrt 7}{2^{18}}$	$\tfrac{7^5\cdot19}{2^{19}}$
$S(-n)$	$3$	$0$	$2^3$	$-\tfrac{2^3\cdot3\sqrt 7}{7}$	$2^5$	$-\tfrac{2^5\cdot5\sqrt 7}{7}$	$\tfrac{2^6\cdot17}{7}$	$-2^7\sqrt{7}$	$\tfrac{2^9\cdot11}{7}$	$-\tfrac{2^{10}\cdot33\sqrt 7}{7^2}$	$\tfrac{2^{10}\cdot29}{7}$	$-\tfrac{2^{14}\cdot11\sqrt 7}{7^2}$	$\tfrac{2^{12}\cdot269}{7^2}$	$-\tfrac{2^{13}\cdot117\sqrt 7}{7^2}$	$\tfrac{2^{14}\cdot51}{7}$	$-\tfrac{2^{21}\cdot17\sqrt 7}{7^3}$	$\tfrac{2^{17}\cdot237}{7^2}$	$-\tfrac{2^{17}\cdot1445\sqrt 7}{7^3}$	$\tfrac{2^{19}\cdot2203}{7^3}$	$-\tfrac{2^{19}\cdot1919\sqrt 7}{7^3}$	$\tfrac{2^{20}\cdot5851}{7^3}$
$C(n)$	$3$	$-\tfrac{1}{2}$	$\tfrac{5}{4}$	$-\tfrac{1}{2}$	$\tfrac{13}{16}$	$-\tfrac{1}{2}$	$\tfrac{19}{32}$	$-\tfrac{57}{128}$	$\tfrac{117}{256}$	$-\tfrac{193}{512}$	$\tfrac{185}{512}$										
$C(-n)$	$3$	$-4$	$24$	$-88$	$416$	$-1824$	$8256$	$-36992$	$166400$	$-747520$	$3359744$										
$T(n)$	$3$	$-\sqrt{7}$	$7\cdot3$	$-31\sqrt{7}$	$7\cdot53$	$-7\cdot87\sqrt{7}$	$7\cdot1011$	$-7^2\cdot239\sqrt{7}$	$7^2\cdot2771$	$-7\cdot32119\sqrt{7}$	$7^2\cdot53189$										
$T(-n)$	$3$	$\sqrt{7}$	$5$	$\tfrac{25\sqrt 7}{7}$	$19$	$\tfrac{103\sqrt 7}{7}$	$\tfrac{563}{7}$	$7\cdot9\sqrt{7}$	$\tfrac{2421}{7}$	$\tfrac{13297\sqrt 7}{7^2}$	$\tfrac{10435}{7}$										

=== Ramanujan identities ===
We also have Ramanujan type identities,

$$\begin{array}{ccccccl}
\sqrt[3]{2\sin 2A}  \!&\!  +  \!&\!   \sqrt[3]{2\sin 2B}   \!&\!  +  \!&\!   \sqrt[3]{2\sin 2C}
\!&\!  =  \!&\!  -\sqrt[18]{7} \times \sqrt[3]{-\sqrt[3]{7} + 6 + 3\left(\sqrt[3]{5 -  3 \sqrt[3]{7}} + \sqrt[3]{4 -  3 \sqrt[3]{7}}\right)} \\[2pt]
\sqrt[3]{2\sin 2A}  \!&\!  +  \!&\!  \sqrt[3]{2\sin 2B}  \!&\!  +  \!&\!  \sqrt[3]{2\sin 2C}
\!&\!  =  \!&\!  -\sqrt[18]{7} \times \sqrt[3]{-\sqrt[3]{7} + 6 + 3\left(\sqrt[3]{5 - 3 \sqrt[3]{7}} + \sqrt[3]{4 - 3 \sqrt[3]{7}}\right)} \\[2pt]
\sqrt[3]{4\sin^2 2A}  \!&\!  +  \!&\!  \sqrt[3]{4\sin^2 2B}  \!&\!  +  \!&\!  \sqrt[3]{4\sin^2 2C}
\!&\!  =  \!&\!  \sqrt[18]{49} \times \sqrt[3]{ \sqrt[3]{49} + 6 + 3\left(\sqrt[3]{12 + 3( \sqrt[3]{49} + 2\sqrt[3]{7})} + \sqrt[3]{11 + 3( \sqrt[3]{49} + 2\sqrt[3]{7})}\right)} \\[6pt]
\sqrt[3]{2\cos 2A}  \!&\!  +  \!&\!  \sqrt[3]{2\cos 2B}  \!&\!  +  \!&\!  \sqrt[3]{2\cos 2C}
\!&\!  =  \!&\!  \sqrt[3]{5 - 3\sqrt[3]{7}} \\[8pt]
\sqrt[3]{4\cos^2 2A}  \!&\!  +  \!&\!  \sqrt[3]{4\cos^2 2B}  \!&\!  +  \!&\!  \sqrt[3]{4\cos^2 2C}
\!&\!  =  \!&\!  \sqrt[3]{11 + 3(2\sqrt[3]{7} + \sqrt[3]{49})} \\[6pt]
\sqrt[3]{\tan 2A}  \!&\!  +  \!&\!  \sqrt[3]{\tan 2B}  \!&\!  +  \!&\!  \sqrt[3]{\tan 2C}
\!&\!  =  \!&\!  -\sqrt[18]{7} \times \sqrt[3]{\sqrt[3]{7} + 6 + 3\left(\sqrt[3]{5 + 3(\sqrt[3]{7} - \sqrt[3]{49})} + \sqrt[3]{- 3 + 3(\sqrt[3]{7} - \sqrt[3]{49})}\right)} \\[2pt]
\sqrt[3]{\tan^2 2A}  \!&\!  +  \!&\!  \sqrt[3]{\tan^2 2B}  \!&\!  +  \!&\!  \sqrt[3]{\tan^2 2C}
\!&\!  =  \!&\!  \sqrt[18]{49} \times \sqrt[3]{3\sqrt[3]{49} + 6 + 3\left(\sqrt[3]{89 + 3(3\sqrt[3]{49} + 5\sqrt[3]{7})} + \sqrt[3]{25 + 3(3\sqrt[3]{49} + 5\sqrt[3]{7})}\right)}
\end{array}$$

$$\begin{array}{ccccccl}
\frac{1}{\sqrt[3]{2\sin 2A}}  \!&\!  +  \!&\!   \frac{1}{\sqrt[3]{2\sin 2B}}  \!&\!  +  \!&\!   \frac{1}{\sqrt[3]{2\sin 2C}}
\!&\!  =  \!&\!  -\frac{1}{\sqrt[18]{7}} \times \sqrt[3]{6 + 3\left(\sqrt[3]{5 - 3 \sqrt[3]{7}} + \sqrt[3]{4 - 3 \sqrt[3]{7}}\right)} \\[2pt]
\frac{1}{\sqrt[3]{4\sin^2 2A}}  \!&\!  +  \!&\!   \frac{1}{\sqrt[3]{4\sin^2 2B}}  \!&\!  +  \!&\!   \frac{1}{\sqrt[3]{4\sin^2 2C}}
\!&\!  =  \!&\!  \frac{1}{\sqrt[18]{49}} \times \sqrt[3]{ 2\sqrt[3]{7} + 6 + 3\left(\sqrt[3]{12 + 3( \sqrt[3]{49} + 2\sqrt[3]{7})} + \sqrt[3]{11 + 3( \sqrt[3]{49} + 2\sqrt[3]{7})}\right)} \\[2pt]
\frac{1}{\sqrt[3]{2\cos 2A}}  \!&\!  +  \!&\!   \frac{1}{\sqrt[3]{2\cos 2B}}  \!&\!  +  \!&\!   \frac{1}{\sqrt[3]{2\cos 2C}}
\!&\!  =  \!&\!  \sqrt[3]{4 - 3\sqrt[3]{7}} \\[6pt]
\frac{1}{\sqrt[3]{4\cos^2 2A}}  \!&\!  +  \!&\!   \frac{1}{\sqrt[3]{4\cos^2 2B}}  \!&\!  +  \!&\!   \frac{1}{\sqrt[3]{4\cos^2 2C}}
\!&\!  =  \!&\!  \sqrt[3]{12 + 3(2\sqrt[3]{7} + \sqrt[3]{49})} \\[2pt]
\frac{1}{\sqrt[3]{\tan 2A}}  \!&\!  +  \!&\!   \frac{1}{\sqrt[3]{\tan 2B}}  \!&\!  +  \!&\!   \frac{1}{\sqrt[3]{\tan 2C}}
\!&\!  =  \!&\!  -\frac{1}{\sqrt[18]{7}} \times \sqrt[3]{-\sqrt[3]{49} + 6 + 3\left(\sqrt[3]{5 + 3(\sqrt[3]{7} - \sqrt[3]{49})} + \sqrt[3]{- 3 + 3(\sqrt[3]{7} - \sqrt[3]{49})}\right)} \\[2pt]
\frac{1}{\sqrt[3]{\tan^2 2A}}  \!&\!  +  \!&\!   \frac{1}{\sqrt[3]{\tan^2 2B}}  \!&\!  +  \!&\!   \frac{1}{\sqrt[3]{\tan^2 2C}}
\!&\!  =  \!&\!  \frac{1}{\sqrt[18]{49}} \times \sqrt[3]{5\sqrt[3]{7} + 6 + 3\left(\sqrt[3]{89 + 3(3\sqrt[3]{49} + 5\sqrt[3]{7})} + \sqrt[3]{25 + 3(3\sqrt[3]{49} + 5\sqrt[3]{7})}\right)}
\end{array}$$

$$\begin{array}{ccccccl}
\sqrt[3]{\frac{\cos 2A}{\cos 2B}}  \!&\! + \!&\!  \sqrt[3]{\frac{\cos 2B}{\cos 2C}}  \!&\! + \!&\!  \sqrt[3]{\frac{\cos 2C}{\cos 2A}}  \!&\! = \!&\!  -\sqrt[3]{7} \\[2pt]
\sqrt[3]{\frac{\cos 2B}{\cos 2A}}  \!&\! + \!&\!  \sqrt[3]{\frac{\cos 2C}{\cos 2B}}  \!&\! + \!&\!  \sqrt[3]{\frac{\cos 2A}{\cos 2C}}  \!&\! = \!&\!  0 \\[2pt]
\sqrt[3]{\frac{\cos^4 2B}{\cos 2A}}  \!&\! + \!&\!  \sqrt[3]{\frac{\cos^4 2C}{\cos 2B}}  \!&\! + \!&\!  \sqrt[3]{\frac{\cos^4 2A}{\cos 2C}}  \!&\! = \!&\!  -\frac{\sqrt[3]{49}}{2} \\[2pt]
\sqrt[3]{\frac{\cos^5 2A}{\cos^2 2B}}  \!&\! + \!&\!  \sqrt[3]{\frac{\cos^5 2B}{\cos^2 2C}}  \!&\! + \!&\!  \sqrt[3]{\frac{\cos^5 2C}{\cos^2 2A}}  \!&\! = \!&\!  0 \\[2pt]
\sqrt[3]{\frac{\cos^5 2B}{\cos^2 2A}}  \!&\! + \!&\!  \sqrt[3]{\frac{\cos^5 2C}{\cos^2 2B}}  \!&\! + \!&\!  \sqrt[3]{\frac{\cos^5 2A}{\cos^2 2C}}  \!&\! = \!&\!  -3\times \frac{\sqrt[3]{7}}{2} \\[2pt]
\sqrt[3]{\frac{\cos^{14}2A}{\cos^5 2B}}  \!&\! + \!&\!  \sqrt[3]{\frac{\cos^{14}2B}{\cos^5 2C}}  \!&\! + \!&\!  \sqrt[3]{\frac{\cos^{14}2C}{\cos^5 2A}}  \!&\! = \!&\!  0 \\[2pt]
\sqrt[3]{\frac{\cos^{14}2B}{\cos^5 2A}}  \!&\! + \!&\!  \sqrt[3]{\frac{\cos^{14}2C}{\cos^5 2B}}  \!&\! + \!&\!  \sqrt[3]{\frac{\cos^{14}2A}{\cos^5 2C}}  \!&\! = \!&\!  -61\times \frac{\sqrt[3]{7}}{8}.
\end{array}$$
