= Optic equation =

Equation of the form 1/a + 1/b = 1/c

Integer solutions to the optic equation 1/a + 1/b = 1/c for 1 ≤ a,b ≤ 99. The number in the circle is c. In the SVG file, hover over a circle to see its solution.

In number theory, the optic equation is an equation that requires the sum of the reciprocals of two positive integers a and b to equal the reciprocal of a third positive integer c:
$$\frac{1}{a}+\frac{1}{b}=\frac{1}{c}.$$

Multiplying both sides by abc shows that the optic equation is equivalent to a Diophantine equation (a polynomial equation in multiple integer variables).

== Solution ==
All solutions in integers a, b, c are given in terms of positive integer parameters m, n, k by
$$\begin{align}
a &= km(m+n), \\
b &= kn(m+n), \\
c &= kmn,
\end{align}$$
where m, n are coprime.

== Appearances in geometry ==
The optic equation with squares appears in the inverse Pythagorean theorem (red). For triangle ABC with right angle at C, then altitude CD (red) perpendicular to hypotenuse AB (blue) is given by the inverse Pythagorean theorem 1/CD^{2} = 1/AC^{2} + 1/BC^{2}. The Pythagorean relation also holds: AB^{2} = AC^{2} + BC^{2}.

The optic equation, permitting but not requiring integer solutions, appears in several contexts in geometry.

In a bicentric quadrilateral, the inradius r, the circumradius R, and the distance x between the incenter and the circumcenter are related by Fuss' theorem according to
$$\frac{1}{(R-x)^2}+\frac{1}{(R+x)^2}=\frac{1}{r^2},$$
and the distances of the incenter I from the vertices A, B, C, D are related to the inradius according to
$$\frac{1}{IA^2}+\frac{1}{IC^2}=\frac{1}{IB^2}+\frac{1}{ID^2}=\frac{1}{r^2}.$$

Crossed ladders. 1/h = 1/A + 1/B.

In the crossed ladders problem, two ladders braced at the bottoms of vertical walls cross at the height h and lean against the opposite walls at heights of A and B. We have $\tfrac{1}{h}=\tfrac{1}{A}+\tfrac{1}{B}.$ Moreover, the formula continues to hold if the walls are slanted and all three measurements are made parallel to the walls.

Let P be a point on the circumcircle of an equilateral triangle △ABC, on the minor arc AB. Let a be the distance from P to A and b be the distance from P to B. On a line passing through P and the far vertex C, let c be the distance from P to the triangle side AB. Then $\tfrac{1}{a}+\tfrac{1}{b}=\tfrac{1}{c}.$

In a trapezoid, draw a segment parallel to the two parallel sides, passing through the intersection of the diagonals and having endpoints on the non-parallel sides. Then if we denote the lengths of the parallel sides as a and b and half the length of the segment through the diagonal intersection as c, the sum of the reciprocals of a and b equals the reciprocal of c.

The special case in which the integers whose reciprocals are taken must be square numbers appears in two ways in the context of right triangles. First, the sum of the reciprocals of the squares of the altitudes from the legs (equivalently, of the squares of the legs themselves) equals the reciprocal of the square of the altitude from the hypotenuse. This holds whether or not the numbers are integers; there is a formula (see here) that generates all integer cases. Second, also in a right triangle the sum of the squared reciprocal of the side of one of the two inscribed squares and the squared reciprocal of the hypotenuse equals the squared reciprocal of the side of the other inscribed square.

The sides of a heptagonal triangle, which shares its vertices with a regular heptagon, satisfy the optic equation.

== Other appearances ==
=== Thin lens equation ===
Distances in the thin lens equation

For a lens of negligible thickness, and focal length f, the distances from the lens to an object, S_{1}, and from the lens to its image, S_{2}, are related by the thin lens formula:
$$\frac{1}{S_1}+\frac{1}{S_2}=\frac{1}{f} .$$

=== Electrical engineering ===
Comparison of effective resistance, inductance and capacitance of two resistors, inductors and capacitors in series and parallel

Components of an electrical circuit or electronic circuit can be connected in what is called a series or parallel configuration. For example, the total resistance value R_{t} of two resistors with resistances R_{1} and R_{2} connected in parallel follows the optic equation:
$$\frac{1}{R_1} + \frac{1}{R_2} = \frac{1}{R_t}.$$

Similarly, the total inductance L_{t} of two inductors with inductances L_{1}, L_{2} connected in parallel is given by:
$$\frac{1}{L_1} + \frac{1}{L_2} = \frac{1}{L_t},$$

and the total capacitance C_{t} of two capacitors with capacitances C_{1}, C_{2} connected in series is as follows:
$$\frac{1}{C_1} + \frac{1}{C_2} = \frac{1}{C_t}.$$

=== Paper folding ===
Folding a rectangular sheet of paper into thirds using the crossed ladders problem

The optic equation of the crossed ladders problem can be applied to folding rectangular paper into three equal parts. One side (the left one illustrated here) is partially folded in half and pinched to leave a mark. The intersection of a line from this mark to an opposite corner, with a diagonal is exactly one third from the bottom edge. The top edge can then be folded down to meet the intersection.

=== Harmonic mean ===
The harmonic mean of a and b is $\tfrac{2}{\frac{1}{a} + \frac{1}{b}}$ or 2c. In other words, c is half the harmonic mean of a and b.

== Relation to Fermat's Last Theorem ==
Fermat's Last Theorem states that the sum of two integers each raised to the same integer power n cannot equal another integer raised to the power n if n > 2. This implies that no solutions to the optic equation have all three integers equal to perfect powers with the same power n > 2. For if $\tfrac{1}{x^n}+\tfrac{1}{y^n}=\tfrac{1}{z^n},$ then multiplying through by $(xyz)^n$ would give $(yz)^n+(xz)^n=(xy)^n,$ which is impossible by Fermat's Last Theorem.

== See also ==
- Erdős–Straus conjecture, a different Diophantine equation involving sums of reciprocals of integers
- Sums of reciprocals
- Parallel
