= Nomogram =

Analog graphical calculator

A typical parallel-scale nomogram. This example calculates the value of T when S = 7.30 and R = 1.17 are substituted into the equation. The isopleth crosses the scale for T at just under 4.65.

A nomogram (from Greek νόμος (nomos) 'law' and γράμμα (gramma) 'that which is drawn'), also called a nomograph, alignment chart, or abac, is a graphical calculating device, a two-dimensional diagram designed to allow the approximate graphical computation of a mathematical function. The field of nomography was invented in 1884 by the French engineer Philbert Maurice d'Ocagne (1862–1938) and used extensively for many years to provide engineers with fast graphical calculations of complicated formulas to a practical precision. Nomograms use a parallel coordinate system invented by d'Ocagne rather than standard Cartesian coordinates.

A nomogram consists of a set of n scales, one for each variable in an equation. Knowing the values of n − 1 variables, the value of the unknown variable can be found, or by fixing the values of some variables, the relationship between the unfixed ones can be studied. The result is obtained by laying a straightedge across the known values on the scales and reading the unknown value from where it crosses the scale for that variable. The virtual or drawn line, created by the straightedge, is called an index line or isopleth.

Nomograms flourished in many different contexts for roughly 75 years because they allowed quick and accurate computations before the age of pocket calculators. Results from a nomogram are obtained very quickly and reliably by simply drawing one or more lines. The user does not have to know how to solve algebraic equations, look up data in tables, use a slide rule, or substitute numbers into equations to obtain results. The user does not even need to know the underlying equation the nomogram represents. In addition, nomograms naturally incorporate implicit or explicit domain knowledge into their design. For example, to create larger nomograms for greater accuracy, the nomographer usually includes only scale ranges that are reasonable and of interest to the problem. Many nomograms include other useful markings such as reference labels and colored regions. All of these provide useful guideposts to the user.

A Smith chart to calculate electrical impedance with no values plotted; although not a nomogram, it is based on similar principles.

Like a slide rule, a nomogram is a graphical analog computation device. Also like a slide rule, its accuracy is limited by the precision with which physical markings can be drawn, reproduced, viewed, and aligned. Unlike the slide rule, which is a general-purpose computation device, a nomogram is designed to perform a specific calculation with tables of values built into the device's scales. Nomograms are typically used in applications for which the level of accuracy they provide is sufficient and useful. Alternatively, a nomogram can be used to check an answer obtained by a more exact but error-prone calculation.

Other types of graphical calculators—such as intercept charts, trilinear diagrams, and hexagonal charts—are sometimes called nomograms. These devices do not meet the definition of a nomogram as a graphical calculator whose solution is found by the use of one or more linear isopleths.

== Description ==
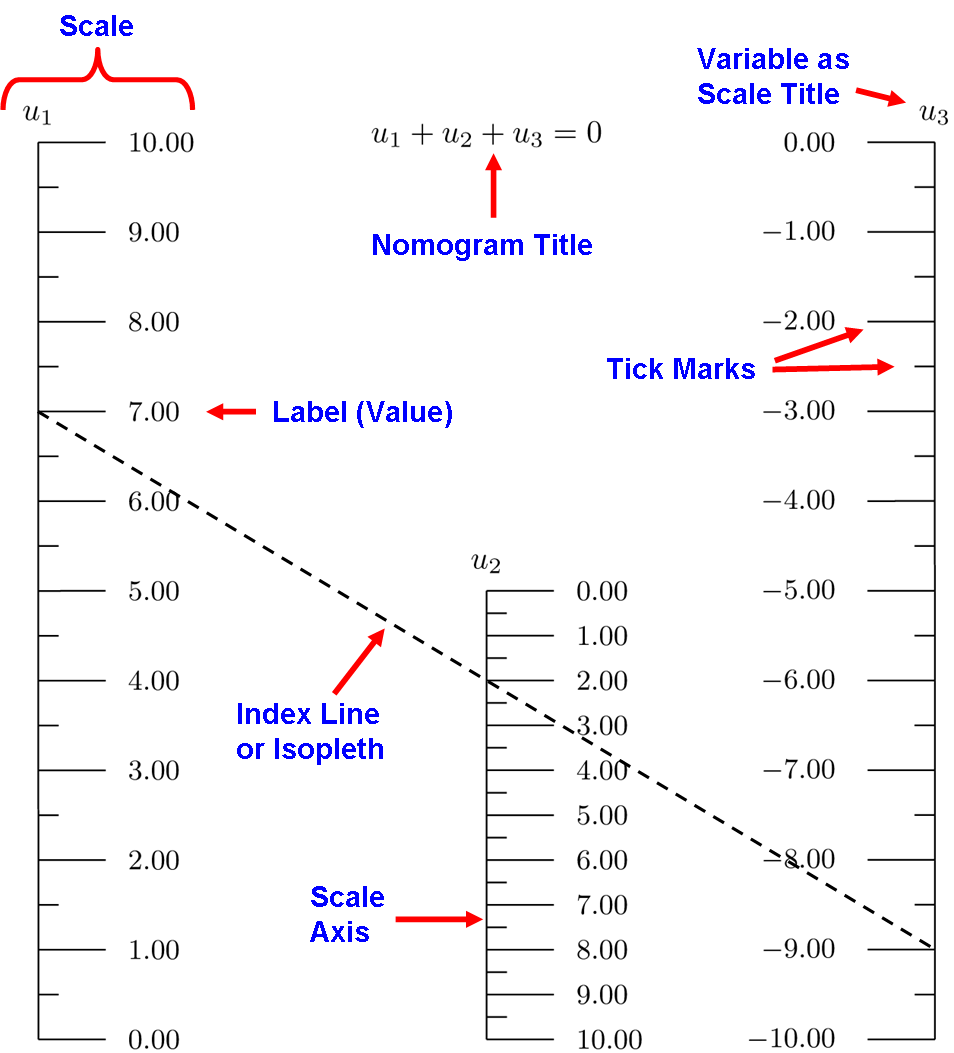
Components of a parallel-scale nomogram

A nomogram for a three-variable equation typically has three separate scales, although some nomograms combine two or even all three scales. Here, two scales represent known values and the third is the scale where the result is read off. The simplest such equation is u_{1} + u_{2} + u_{3} = 0 for the three variables u_{1}, u_{2}, and u_{3}. An example of this type of nomogram is shown on the right, annotated with terms used to describe the parts of a nomogram.

More complicated equations can sometimes be expressed as the sum of functions of the three variables. For example, the nomogram at the top of this article could be constructed as a parallel-scale nomogram because it can be expressed as such a sum after taking logarithms of both sides of the equation.

The scale for the unknown variable can lie between the other two scales or outside of them. The known values of the calculation are marked on the scales for those variables, and a line is drawn between these marks. The result is read off the unknown scale at the point where the line intersects that scale. The scales include tick marks to indicate exact number locations, and they may also include labeled reference values. These scales may be linear or logarithmic, or have some other more complex relationship.

The sample isopleth shown in red on the nomogram at the top of this article calculates the value of T when S = 7.30 and R = 1.17. The isopleth crosses the scale for T at just under 4.65; a larger figure printed in high resolution on paper would yield T = 4.64 to three-digit precision. Any variable can be calculated from values of the other two, a feature of nomograms that is particularly useful for equations in which a variable cannot be algebraically isolated from the other variables.

Straight scales are useful for relatively simple calculations, but for more complex calculations, the use of simple or elaborate curved scales may be required. Nomograms for more than three variables can be constructed by incorporating a grid of scales for two of the variables, or by concatenating individual nomograms of fewer numbers of variables into a compound nomogram.

Nomograms to graphically calculate arithmetic (1), geometric (2) and harmonic (3) means, z of x=40 and y=10 (red), and x=45 and y=5 (blue) – the arithmetic and harmonic means use linear scales while the geometric mean uses logarithmic scales.

== Applications ==
Nomograms have been used in an extensive array of applications. A sample includes:

- The original application by d'Ocagne, the automation of complicated cut-and-fill calculations for earth removal during the construction of the French national railway system. This was an important proof of concept, because the calculations are non-trivial and the results translated into significant savings of time, effort, and money.
- The design of channels, pipes and wires for regulating the flow of water.
- The work of Lawrence Henderson, in which nomograms were used to correlate many different aspects of blood physiology. It was the first major use of nomograms in the United States and also the first medical nomograms anywhere.
- Medical fields, such as pharmacy and oncology.
- Ballistics calculations prior to fire control systems, where calculating time was critical.
- Machine-shop calculations, to convert blueprint dimensions and perform calculations based on material dimensions and properties. These nomograms often included markings for standard dimensions and for available manufactured parts.
- Statistics, for complicated calculations of properties of distributions and for operations research, including the design of acceptance tests for quality control.
- Operations research, to obtain results in a variety of optimization problems.
- Chemistry and chemical engineering, to encapsulate both general physical relationships and empirical data for specific compounds.
- Aeronautics, in which nomograms were used for decades in the cockpits of aircraft of all descriptions. As a navigation and flight control aid, nomograms were fast, compact, and easy-to-use calculators.
- Astronomical calculations, as in the post-launch orbital calculations of Sputnik 1 by P. E. Elyasberg.
- Engineering work of all kinds: electrical design of filters and transmission lines, mechanical calculations of stress and loading, optical calculations, and so forth.
- Military, where complex calculations need to be made in the field quickly and with reliability not dependent on electrical devices.
- Seismology, where nomograms have been developed to estimate earthquake magnitude and to present results of probabilistic seismic hazard analyses.

== Examples ==
=== Parallel-resistance/thin-lens ===
Parallel electrical resistance nomogram

The nomogram below performs the computation:
$$f(A,B)=\frac{1}{1/A+1/B}=\frac{AB}{A+B}$$
This nomogram is interesting because it performs a useful nonlinear calculation using only straight-line, equally-graduated scales. While the diagonal line has a scale $\sqrt{2}$ times larger than the axes scales, the numbers on it exactly match those directly below or to its left, and thus it can be easily created by drawing a straight line diagonally on a sheet of graph paper.

A and B are entered on the horizontal and vertical scales, and the result is read from the diagonal scale. Being proportional to the harmonic mean of A and B, this formula has several applications. For example, it is the parallel-resistance formula in electronics, and the thin-lens equation in optics.

In the example, the red line demonstrates that parallel resistors of 56 and 42 ohms have a combined resistance of 24 ohms. It also demonstrates that an object at a distance of 56 cm from a lens whose focal length is 24 cm forms a real image at a distance of 42 cm.

=== Chi-squared test computation ===
Chi-squared distribution nomogram

The nomogram below can be used to perform an approximate computation of some values needed when performing a familiar statistical test, Pearson's chi-squared test. This nomogram demonstrates the use of curved scales with unevenly spaced graduations.

The relevant expression is:
$$\frac{(OBS - EXP)^2}{EXP}$$
The scale along the top is shared among five different ranges of observed values: A, B, C, D and E. The observed value is found in one of these ranges, and the tick mark used on that scale is found immediately above it. Then the curved scale used for the expected value is selected based on the range. For example, an observed value of 9 would use the tick mark above the 9 in range A, and curved scale A would be used for the expected value. An observed value of 81 would use the tick mark above 81 in range E, and curved scale E would be used for the expected value. This allows five different nomograms to be incorporated into a single diagram.

In this manner, the blue line demonstrates the computation of:

(9 − 5)^{2} / 5 = 3.2

and the red line demonstrates the computation of:

(81 − 70)^{2} / 70 = 1.7

In performing the test, Yates's correction for continuity is often applied, and simply involves subtracting 0.5 from the observed values. A nomogram for performing the test with Yates's correction could be constructed simply by shifting each "observed" scale half a unit to the left, so that the 1.0, 2.0, 3.0, ... graduations are placed where the values 0.5, 1.5, 2.5, ... appear on the present chart.

=== Food risk assessment ===
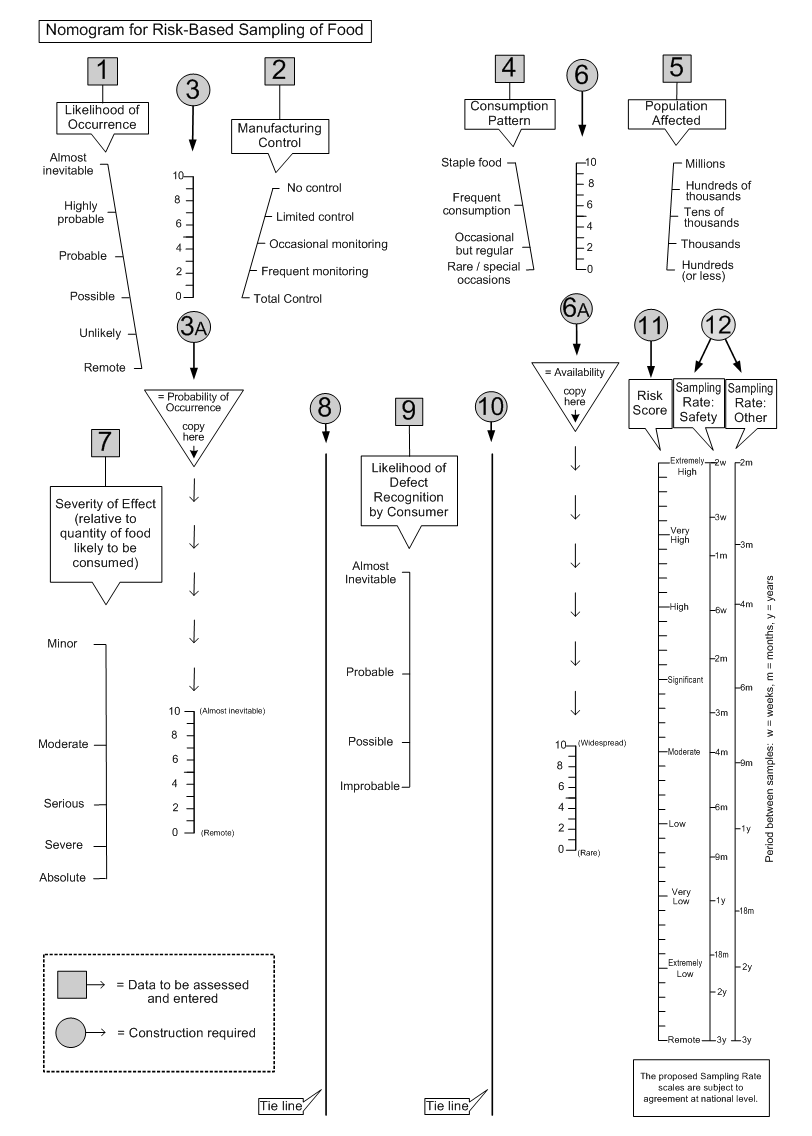
Food risk assessment nomogram

Although nomograms represent mathematical relationships, not all are mathematically derived. The following one was developed graphically to achieve appropriate end results that could readily be defined by the product of their relationships in subjective units rather than numerically. The use of non-parallel axes enabled the non-linear relationships to be incorporated into the model.

The numbers in square boxes denote the axes requiring input after appropriate assessment.

The pair of nomograms at the top of the image determine the probability of occurrence and the availability, which are then incorporated into the bottom multistage nomogram.

Lines 8 and 10 are "tie lines" or "pivot lines" and are used for the transition between the stages of the compound nomogram.

The final pair of parallel logarithmic scales (12) are not nomograms as such, but reading-off scales to translate the risk score (11, remote to extremely high) into a sampling frequency to address safety aspects and other "consumer protection" aspects respectively. This stage requires political "buy in" balancing cost against risk. The example uses a three-year minimum frequency for each, though with the high-risk end of the scales different for the two aspects, giving different frequencies for the two, but both subject to an overall minimum sampling of every food for all aspects at least once every three years.

This risk assessment nomogram was developed by the UK Public Analyst Service with funding from the UK Food Standards Agency for use as a tool to guide the appropriate frequency of sampling and analysis of food for official food control purposes, intended to be used to assess all potential problems with all foods, although not yet adopted.

=== Other quick nomograms ===
Using a ruler, one can easily read the missing term of the law of sines or the roots of the quadratic and cubic equation.

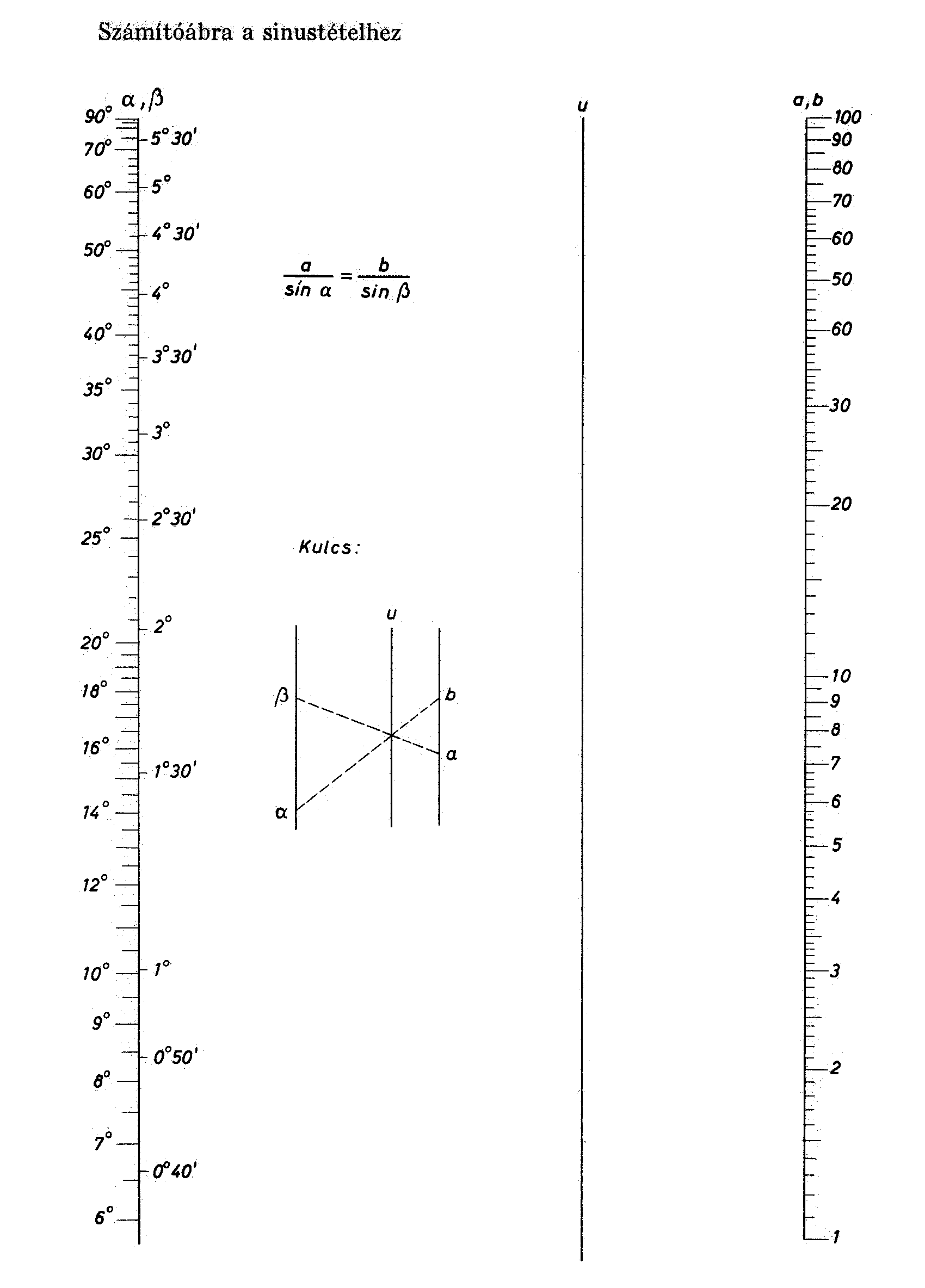
Nomogram for the law of sines

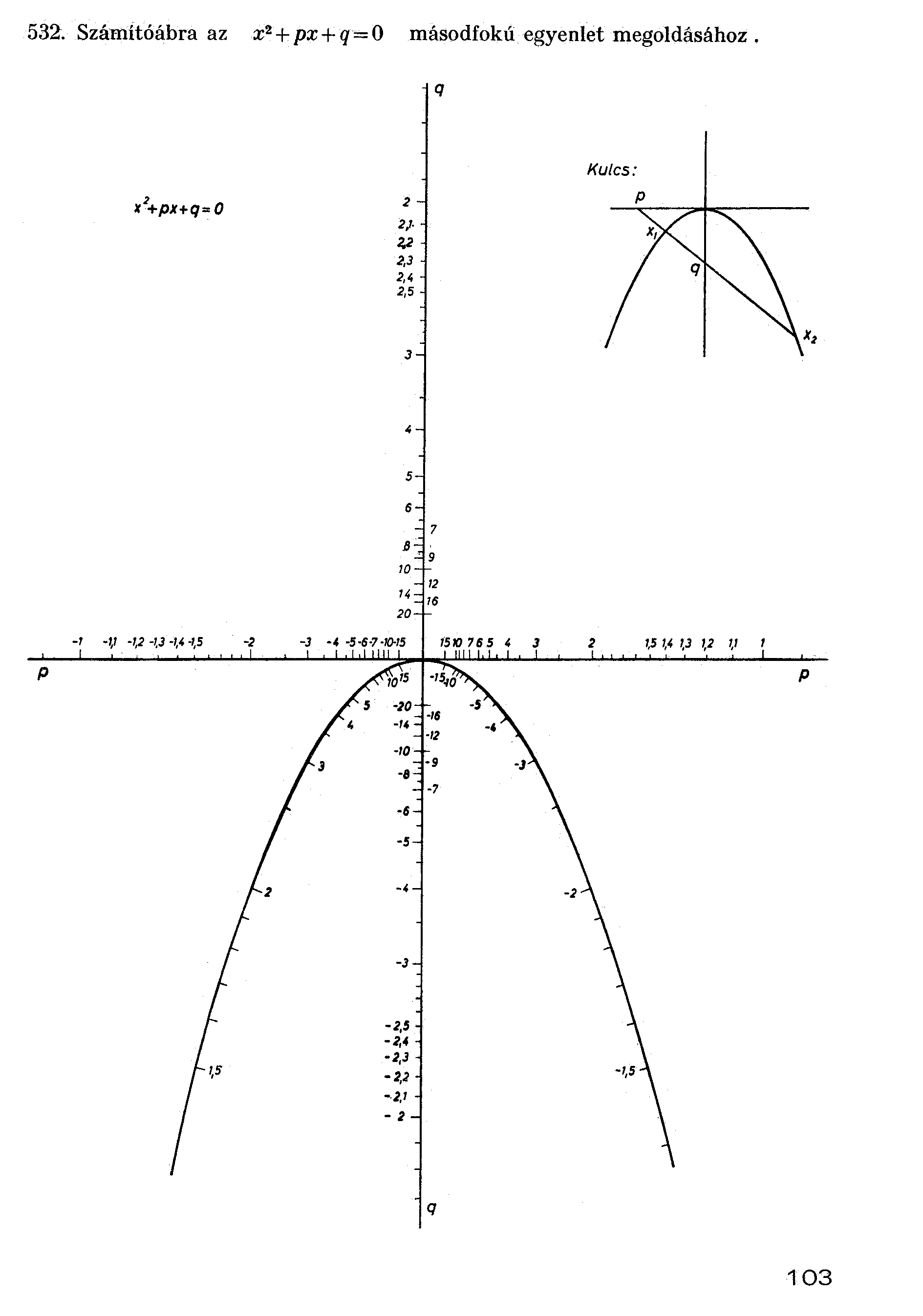
Nomogram for solving the quadratic x^{2} + px + q = 0

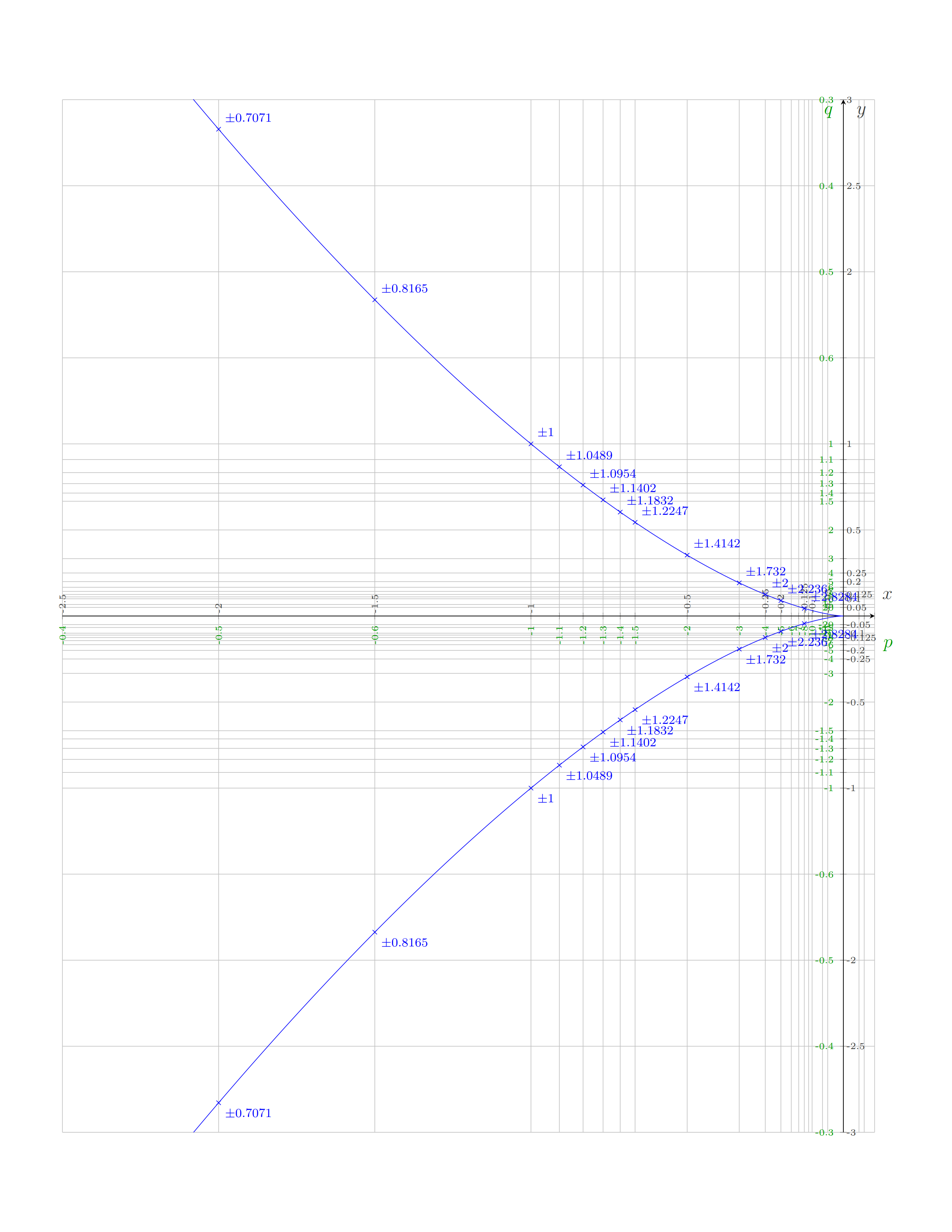
Nomogram for solving the cubic x^{3} + px + q = 0

== See also ==
- Cartogram
- Hilbert's thirteenth problem
- Kolmogorov–Arnold representation theorem
- Load line (electronics)
- Log-log graph
- Semilog graph
- Slide rule
