= Tamas Gombosi =

- Born: 1947 (age 78–79); Budapest, Hungary

Academic background
- Education: MSc, Physics, 1970, PhD, Physics, 1974, Eötvös Loránd University

Academic work
- Institutions: University of Michigan; Russian Space Research Institute

Tamas I. Gombosi (born 1947) is a Hungarian space plasma physicist. He is the Konstantin I. Gringauz Distinguished University Professor of Space Science and Rollin M. Gerstacker Professor of Engineering at the University of Michigan.

== Early life and education ==
Gombosi was born in 1947 in Budapest, Hungary as the son of Hungarian Holocaust survivors. He completed his graduate degrees in physics from Eötvös Loránd University in 1970 and 1974 before conducting his postdoctoral research at the Russian Space Research Institute. While in Moscow, Gombosi worked on the Vener electron flux data with Konstantin Gringauz and was a member of the scientific staff of the Central Research Institute for Physics. While with the institute, Gombosi developed a better way to decode data during the Russian mission Interkosmos 3 and began to be mentored by Pavel Elyasberg. He remained in Moscow before being recruited by Andrew F. Nagy to join the faculty at the University of Michigan (UMich) in the late 1970s.

== Career ==
Gombosi joined the faculty at UMich as a visiting scientist to work with Nagy on Pioneer Venus. He returned to Moscow before coming back to the United States permanently in 1983. Despite joining UMich, Gombosi remained involved in both the United States and Soviet Union space missions. Gombosi was involved in the Phobos program to Mars, the Cassini–Huygens mission to Saturn, the Rosetta mission to comet 67P, and the STEREO mission to observe the Sun. His research team also developed a physics-based space weather-modeling framework that was adopted by the Space Weather Prediction Center to predict forecasts. In the late 1990s, Gombosi led a research team in developing the first 3-D simulation of the Sun's heliosphere, its upper atmosphere. Later, while serving as Chair of the Department of Atmospheric, Oceanic and Space Sciences, Gombosi led the effort for UMich to join the Department of Energy Fusion Science Center in 2004.

By 2014, Gombosi was serving as the Rollin M. Gerstacker Professor of Engineering, professor of atmospheric, oceanic and space sciences, professor of aerospace engineering, and director of the Center for Space Environment Modeling. The Rollin M. Gerstacker Foundation endowed and funded this professorship.

As such, he was named the Konstantin I. Gringauz Distinguished University Professor of Space Science. Following this promotion, Gombosi was awarded the 2017 International Kristian Birkeland Medal for his "outstanding scientific results in the field of space weather." In 2020, Gombosi was awarded the John Adam Fleming Medal for "original research and technical leadership in geomagnetism, atmospheric electricity, aeronomy, space physics, and/or related sciences." The following year, Gombosi was appointed to the National Oceanic and Atmospheric Administration Space Weather Advisory Group (SWAG).

== Personal life ==
Gombosi and his wife Eszter, a Senior Programmer Analyst in the UMich Department of Biostatistics, have two children together.
