= Pavel Elyasberg =

Soviet rocket and space technology expert

Pavel Yefimovich Elyasberg
- Born: 5 June 1914; Zhytomyr, Volhynia Governorate, Russian Empire
- Died: 30 March 1988 (aged 73); Moscow, USSR
- Occupation: Scientist

Pavel Yefimovich Elyasberg (Russian: Павел Ефимович Эльясберг; 5 June 1914 - 30 March 1988) was one of the founders of space ballistics in the former Soviet Union. He was a Doctor of Technical Sciences, Professor, Participant of the Great Patriotic War, Colonel, twice awarded the Order of the Red Star, as well as the Order of the Patriotic War Second Class, and the Order of the Badge of Honour. He was also awarded the Lenin Prize.

== Biography ==
Elyasberg was born into a Jewish family on 5 June 1914 in Zhytomyr (now in Ukraine). His father Khaim Berovich (Efim Borisovich) Elyasberg (1874–1942) was from a wealthy Vilnius family, received a university education, and became a prominent figure in BUND. His mother Debora Khaimovna (maiden name Tipograf) graduated from the Bestuzhev Medical Courses. He had a brother, Maksim Efimovich Elyasberg. The family moved to Kyiv in 1920.

Elyasberg graduated from the postgraduate program at Kyiv University, as a student of Mikhail Lavrentyev.

From 1939 he served in the Red Army, participated in the Great Patriotic War, and was the head of artillery workshops.

In 1947-1968 he worked at NII-4 (Branch of NII-4 of Ministry of Defense of the USSR) in Bolshevo as a Colonel, Doctor of Technical Sciences.

Since 1968, after being discharged into the reserve, he worked as the head of the ballistics department of the Space Research Institute of the USSR Academy of Sciences.

He also taught at Moscow State University, and since 1963 he has been a professor in the Department of Theoretical Mechanics.

He died on 30 March 1988 and was buried in Moscow at the Vostryakovskoye Cemetery (No. 32)

== Honors ==
- Lenin Prize, 1957, for the launch of the first artificial Earth satellite.
- Order of the Patriotic War, 2nd class (3 April 1945)
- Order of the Red Star, twice (1 November 1943; 1956)
- Order of the Badge of Honor
- Medal "For Battle Merit" (30 October 1942; was nominated for the Medal "For Courage")
- Medal "For the Defence of the Caucasus" (14 September 1944)

== Publications ==
- Introduction to the Theory of Flight of Artificial Earth Satellites (Введение в теорию полёта ИСЗ), Publishing House Nauka, Moscow, 1965; English version translated by Israel Program for Scientific Translations, Jerusalem, 1967.
