= Nambooripad order =

Mathematical group

In mathematics, Nambooripad order (also called Nambooripad's partial order) is a certain natural partial order on a regular semigroup discovered by K S S Nambooripad in late seventies. Since the same partial order was also independently discovered by Robert E Hartwig, some authors refer to it as Hartwig–Nambooripad order. "Natural" here means that the order is defined in terms of the operation on the semigroup.

In general Nambooripad's order in a regular semigroup is not compatible with multiplication. It is compatible with multiplication only if the semigroup is pseudo-inverse (locally inverse).

== Precursors ==
Nambooripad's partial order is a generalisation of an earlier known partial order on the set of idempotents in any semigroup. The partial order on the set E of idempotents in a semigroup S is defined as follows: For any e and f in E, e ≤ f if and only if e = ef = fe.

Vagner in 1952 had extended this to inverse semigroups as follows: For any a and b in an inverse semigroup S, a ≤ b if and only if a = eb for some idempotent e in S. In the symmetric inverse semigroup, this order actually coincides with the inclusion of partial transformations considered as sets. This partial order is compatible with multiplication on both sides, that is, if a ≤ b then ac ≤ bc and ca ≤ cb for all c in S.

Nambooripad extended these definitions to regular semigroups.

== Definitions (regular semigroup) ==
The partial order in a regular semigroup discovered by Nambooripad can be defined in several equivalent ways. Three of these definitions are given below. The equivalence of these definitions and other definitions have been established by Mitsch.

=== Definition (Nambooripad) ===
Let S be any regular semigroup and S^{1} be the semigroup obtained by adjoining the identity 1 to S. For any x in S let R_{x} be the Green R-class of S containing x. The relation R_{x} ≤ R_{y} defined by xS^{1} ⊆ yS^{1} is a partial order in the collection of Green R-classes in S. For a and b in S the relation ≤ defined by

- a ≤ b if and only if R_{a} ≤ R_{b} and a = fb for some idempotent f in R_{a}

is a partial order in S. This is a natural partial order in S.

=== Definition (Hartwig) ===
For any element a in a regular semigroup S, let V(a) be the set of inverses of a, that is, the set of all x in S such that axa = a and xax = x. For a and b in S the relation ≤ defined by

- a ≤ b if and only if a'a = a'b and aa' = ba' for some a' in V(a)

is a partial order in S. This is a natural partial order in S.

=== Definition (Mitsch) ===
For a and b in a regular semigroup S the relation ≤ defined by

- a ≤ b if and only if a = xa = xb = by for some element x and y in S

is a partial order in S. This is a natural partial order in S.

== Extension to arbitrary semigroups (P.R. Jones) ==
For a and b in an arbitrary semigroup S, a ≤_{J} b iff there exist e, f idempotents in S^{1} such that a = be = fb.

This is a reflexive relation on any semigroup, and if S is regular it coincides with the Nambooripad order.

== Natural partial order of Mitsch ==
Mitsch further generalized the definition of Nambooripad order to arbitrary semigroups.

The most insightful formulation of Mitsch's order is the following. Let a and b be two elements of an arbitrary semigroup S. Then a ≤_{M} b iff there exist t and s in S^{1} such that tb = ta = a = as = bs.

In general, for an arbitrary semigroup ≤_{J} is a subset of ≤_{M}. For epigroups however, they coincide. Furthermore, if b is a regular element of S (which need not be all regular), then for any a in S a ≤_{J} b iff a ≤_{M} b.

== See also ==
- Regular semigroup
- Inverse semigroup
