= E-semigroup =

In the area of mathematics known as semigroup theory, an E-semigroup is a semigroup in which the idempotents form a subsemigroup.

Certain classes of E-semigroups have been studied long before the more general class, in particular, a regular semigroup that is also an E-semigroup is known as an orthodox semigroup.

Weipoltshammer proved that the notion of weak inverse (the existence of which is one way to define E-inversive semigroups) can also be used to define/characterize E-semigroups as follows: a semigroup S is an E-semigroup if and only if, for all a and b ∈ S, W(ab) = W(b)W(a), where W(a) ≝ {x ∈ S | xax = x} is the set of weak inverses of a.
