= Munn semigroup =

In mathematics, the Munn semigroup is the inverse semigroup of isomorphisms between principal ideals of a semilattice (a commutative semigroup of idempotents). Munn semigroups are named for the Scottish mathematician Walter Douglas Munn (1929–2008).

== Construction's steps ==
Let $E$ be a semilattice.

1) For all e in E, we define Ee: = {i ∈ E : i ≤ e} which is a principal ideal of E.

2) For all e, f in E, we define T_{e,f} as the set of isomorphisms of Ee onto Ef.

3) The Munn semigroup of the semilattice E is defined as: T_{E} := $\bigcup_{e,f\in E}$ { T_{e,f} : (e, f) ∈ U }.

The semigroup's operation is composition of partial mappings. In fact, we can observe that T_{E} ⊆ I_{E} where I_{E} is the symmetric inverse semigroup because all isomorphisms are partial one-one maps from subsets of E onto subsets of E.

The idempotents of the Munn semigroup are the identity maps 1_{Ee}.

== Theorem ==
For every semilattice $E$, the semilattice of idempotents of $T_E$ is isomorphic to E.

== Example ==
Let $E=\{0,1,2,...\}$. Then $E$ is a semilattice under the usual ordering of the natural numbers ($0 < 1 < 2 < ...$). The principal ideals of $E$ are then $En=\{0,1,2,...,n\}$ for all $n$. So, the principal ideals $Em$ and $En$ are isomorphic if and only if $m=n$.

Thus $T_{n,n}$ = {$1_{En}$} where $1_{En}$ is the identity map from En to itself, and $T_{m,n}=\emptyset$ if $m\not=n$. The semigroup product of $1_{Em}$ and $1_{En}$ is $1_{E\operatorname{min} \{m, n\}}$. In this example, $T_E = \{1_{E0}, 1_{E1}, 1_{E2}, \ldots \} \cong E.$
