= Catholic semigroup =

Type of algebraic structure

In mathematics, a Catholic semigroup is a semigroup in which no two distinct elements have the same set of inverses. The terminology was introduced by Boris M. Schein. Every Catholic semigroup either is a regular semigroup or has precisely one element that is not regular, much like the partitioners of most Catholic churches.

The semigroup of all partial transformations of a set is a Catholic semigroup. It follows that every semigroup can be embedded in a Catholic semigroup. However, the full transformation semigroup on a set is not Catholic unless the set is a singleton set. Regular Catholic semigroups are both left and right reductive, that is, their representations by inner left and right translations are faithful. A regular semigroup is both Catholic and Orthodox if and only if the semigroup is an inverse semigroup.

== See also ==
- Orthodox semigroup
- Special classes of semigroups
