= Ellis–Numakura lemma =

Compact topological semigroup

In mathematics, the Ellis–Numakura lemma states that if S is a non-empty semigroup with a topology such that S is a compact space and the product is semi-continuous, then S has an idempotent element p, (that is, with pp = p). The lemma is named after Robert Ellis and Katsui Numakura.

The compact topological semigroups appearing in this lemma should be distinguished with compact semigroups, in which "compact" is not used with its topological meaning.

== Applications ==
Applying this lemma to the Stone–Čech compactification βN of the natural numbers shows that there are idempotent elements in βN. The product on βN is not continuous, but is only semi-continuous (right or left, depending on the preferred construction, but never both).

== Proof ==
- By compactness and Zorn's Lemma, there is a minimal non-empty compact sub semigroup of S, so replacing S by this sub semi group we can assume S is minimal.
- Choose p in S. The set Sp is a non-empty compact subsemigroup, so by minimality it is S and in particular contains p, so the set of elements q with qp = p is non-empty.
- The set of all elements q with qp = p is a compact semigroup, and is nonempty by the previous step, so by minimality it is the whole of S and therefore contains p. So pp = p.
