= Orthodox semigroup =

In mathematics, an orthodox semigroup is a regular semigroup whose set of idempotents forms a subsemigroup. In more recent terminology, an orthodox semigroup is a regular E-semigroup. The term orthodox semigroup was coined by T. E. Hall and presented in a paper published in 1969. Certain special classes of orthodox semigroups had been studied earlier. For example, semigroups that are also unions of groups, in which the sets of idempotents form subsemigroups were studied by P. H. H. Fantham in 1960.

== Examples ==
- Consider the binary operation on the set S = { a, b, c, x } defined by the following Cayley table :

	a	b	c	x
a	a	b	c	x
b	b	b	b	b
c	c	c	c	c
x	x	c	b	a

Then S is an orthodox semigroup under this operation, the subsemigroup of idempotents being { a, b, c }.

- Inverse semigroups and bands are examples of orthodox semigroups.

== Some elementary properties ==
The set of idempotents in an orthodox semigroup has several interesting properties. Let S be a regular semigroup and for any a in S let V(a) denote the set of inverses of a. Then the following are equivalent:

- S is orthodox.
- If a and b are in S and if x is in V(a) and y is in V(b) then yx is in V(ab).
- If e is an idempotent in S then every inverse of e is also an idempotent.
- For every a, b in S, if V(a) ∩ V(b) ≠ ∅ then V(a) = V(b).

== Structure ==
The structure of orthodox semigroups have been determined in terms of bands and inverse semigroups. The Hall–Yamada pullback theorem describes this construction. The construction requires the concepts of pullbacks (in the category of semigroups) and Nambooripad representation of a fundamental regular semigroup.

== See also ==
- Catholic semigroup
- Special classes of semigroups
