= K. S. S. Nambooripad =

Indian mathematician (1935–2020)

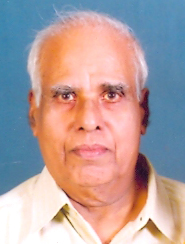
- Born: 6 April 1935; Puttumanoor, Cochin, India
- Died: 4 January 2020 (aged 84); Thiruvananthapuram, Kerala, India
- Citizenship: Indian
- Education: Maharajas College, Ernakulam; University of Kerala
- Known for: Seminal contributions to the structure theory of regular semigroups
- Scientific career
- Fields: Mathematician
- Workplaces: University of Kerala
- Doctoral advisor: M. R. Parameswaran; B. R. Srinivasan; Y. Sitaraman

K. S. S. Nambooripad (6 April 1935 – 4 January 2020) was an Indian mathematician who made fundamental contributions to the structure theory of regular semigroups. Nambooripad was also instrumental in popularising the TeX software in India and also in introducing and championing the cause of the free software movement in India.

He was with the Department of Mathematics, University of Kerala, since 1976. He served the department as its Head from 1983 until his retirement from University service in 1995. After retirement, he was associated with the academic and research activities of the Center for Mathematical Sciences, Thiruvananthapuram in various capacities.

He died on January 4, 2020, in Thiruvananthapuram, at the age of 84.

== Early years ==
Nambooripad was born on 6 April 1935 in Puttumanoor near Cochin in a Kerala Nambudiri Brahmin family from central Kerala . He received traditional vedic education up to the age of fifteen after which he joined a modern school offering formal education. He obtained the BSc(Hons) degree of University of Kerala from Maharaja's College, Ernakulam, in 1956. He spent a few years teaching mathematics in some privately managed colleges before joining the newly started Department of Mathematics, University of Kerala, as a research scholar in mathematics in 1965. He was initially under the supervision of Prof. M. R. Parameswaran. A year later he came under the guidance of Prof. B. R. Srinivasan. About two years later, consequent on the departure of Prof. B. R. Srinivasan from University of Kerala, Nambooripad became a student of Prof. Y. Sitaraman. He was awarded the PhD degree in 1974.

== Major contributions ==
Nambooripad's basic contributions are in the structure theory of regular semigroups. A semigroup is a set S together with an associative binary operation in S. A semigroup S is said to be regular if for every a in S there is an element b in S such that aba = a. Nambooripad axiomatically characterised the structure of the set of idempotents in a regular semigroup. He called a set having this structure a biordered set. "The axioms defining a biordered set are quite complicated. However, considering the general nature of semigroups, it is rather surprising that such a finite axiomatization is even possible." A full treatment of the theory was published as a single paper number of the Memoirs of American mathematical Society in 1979. "In the mid 70s A. H. Clifford became very much excited by the work of Nambooripad on the structure of regular semigroups in terms of idempotent ordering and sandwich matrices and wrote several expository papers on Nambooripad structure theorem for regular semigroups".

He later developed an alternative approach to describe the structure of regular semigroups. This particular work utilizes the abstract theory of cross-connections to provide a useful framework for studying various classes of regular semigroups.

== As a TeX populariser ==
TeX was introduced into Kerala by Nambooripad. After a visit to the United States in early 1990s, he brought the TeX programme to Kerala in fourteen floppy disks. Nambooripad encouraged his students to learn and use TeX, especially for preparing their theses. One of his students was E. Krishnan, one of the authors of the LaTeX primer2 published as an electronic book by the Indian TeX User Group. Krishnan also played an important role in establishing the Free Software Foundation of India. Another person inspired by Nambooripad was Chandroth Vasudevan Radhakrishnan who is running a company called River Valley Technologies since 1995 for typesetting of scientific journals and books. Nambooripad was the prime catalyst for the formation of Indian TeX Users Group in 1998. He was the inaugural Chairman of the Group.

== See also ==
- Nambooripad order

== Selected publications ==
1. "Structure of regular semigroups - I". Memoirs of American Mathematical Society, 22 (224). 1979.
2. "The natural partial order on a regular semigroup". Proceedings of the Edinburgh Mathematical Society 23 : 249–260. 1980.
3. (with F. Pastijn) "V-regular semigroup". Proceedings of Royal Society of Edinburgh 88A : 275–291. 1981.
4. (with F. Pastjin) "Regular involution semigroups". Semigroups Colloquia Mathematica Societatis János Bolyai, Szeged (Hungary) : 199–256. 1981.
5. (with J. C. Meakin) "Coextensions of regular semigroups by rectangular bands - I". Transactions of American Mathematical Society 269:197-224. 1982.
6. (with J. C. Meakin) "Coextensions of regular semigroups by rectangular bands - II". Transactions of American Mathematical Society 272 : 555–568. 1982.
7. "Structure of regular semigroups - II : Cross-connections". Publication No.15. Centre for Mathematical Sciences, Thiruvananthapuram, India. 1989.
8. "G-lattices". Proceedings of the Monash Conference on Semigroup Theory in honour of G. B. Preston held in July 1990 : 224–241. World Scientific Publishing Co. 1991.
9. (with E. Krishnan) "The semigroup of Fredholm operators". Forum Mathematicum 5 : 313–368. 1993.
