= Dimensional operator =

In mathematics, specifically set theory, a dimensional operator on a set E is a function from the subsets of E to the subsets of E.

== Definition ==
If the power set of E is denoted P(E) then a dimensional operator on E is a map

$$d:P(E)\rightarrow P(E)\,$$

that satisfies the following properties for S,T ∈ P(E):

1. S ⊆ d(S);
2. d(S) = d(d(S)) (d is idempotent);
3. if S ⊆ T then d(S) ⊆ d(T);
4. if Ω is the set of finite subsets of S then d(S) = ∪_{A∈Ω}d(A);
5. if x ∈ E and y ∈ d(S ∪ {x}) \ d(S), then x ∈ d(S ∪ {y}).

The final property is known as the exchange axiom.

== Examples ==
1. For any set E the identity map on P(E) is a dimensional operator.
2. The map which takes any subset S of E to E itself is a dimensional operator on E.
