= Weak inverse =

In mathematics, the term weak inverse is used with several meanings.

== Theory of semigroups ==
In the theory of semigroups, a weak inverse of an element x in a semigroup (S, •) is an element y such that y • x • y = y. If every element has a weak inverse, the semigroup is called an E-inversive or E-dense semigroup. An E-inversive semigroup may equivalently be defined by requiring that for every element x ∈ S, there exists y ∈ S such that x • y and y • x are idempotents.

An element x of S for which there is an element y of S such that x • y • x = x is called regular. A regular semigroup is a semigroup in which every element is regular. This is a stronger notion than weak inverse. Every regular semigroup is E-inversive, but not vice versa.

If every element x in S has a unique inverse y in S in the sense that x • y • x = x and y • x • y = y then S is called an inverse semigroup.

== Category theory ==
In category theory, a weak inverse of an object A in a monoidal category C with monoidal product ⊗ and unit object I is an object B such that both A ⊗ B and B ⊗ A are isomorphic to the unit object I of C. A monoidal category in which every morphism is invertible and every object has a weak inverse is called a 2-group.

== See also ==
- Generalized inverse
- Von Neumann regular ring
