= E-dense semigroup =

In abstract algebra, an E-dense semigroup (also called an E-inversive semigroup) is a semigroup in which every element a has at least one weak inverse x, meaning that xax = x. The notion of weak inverse is (as the name suggests) weaker than the notion of inverse used in a regular semigroup (which requires that axa=a).

The above definition of an E-inversive semigroup S is equivalent with any of the following:

- for every element a ∈ S there exists another element b ∈ S such that ab is an idempotent.
- for every element a ∈ S there exists another element c ∈ S such that ca is an idempotent.

This explains the name of the notion as the set of idempotents of a semigroup S is typically denoted by E(S).

The concept of E-inversive semigroup was introduced by Gabriel Thierrin in 1955. Some authors use E-dense to refer only to E-inversive semigroups in which the idempotents commute.

More generally, a subsemigroup T of S is said dense in S if, for all x ∈ S, there exists y ∈ S such that both xy ∈ T and yx ∈ T.

A semigroup with zero is said to be an E*-dense semigroup if every element other than the zero has at least one non-zero weak inverse. Semigroups in this class have also been called 0-inversive semigroups.

== Examples ==
- Any regular semigroup is E-dense (but not vice versa).
- Any eventually regular semigroup is E-dense.
- Any periodic semigroup (and in particular, any finite semigroup) is E-dense.

== See also ==
- Dense set
- E-semigroup
