= Biordered set =

A biordered set (otherwise known as boset) is a mathematical object that occurs in the description of the structure of the set of idempotents in a semigroup.

The set of idempotents in a semigroup is a biordered set and every biordered set is the set of idempotents of some semigroup. A regular biordered set is a biordered set with an additional property. The set of idempotents in a regular semigroup is a regular biordered set, and every regular biordered set is the set of idempotents of some regular semigroup.

== History ==
The concept and the terminology were developed by K S S Nambooripad in the early 1970s. In 2002, Patrick Jordan introduced the term boset as an abbreviation of biordered set. The defining properties of a biordered set are expressed in terms of two quasiorders defined on the set and hence the name biordered set.

According to Mohan S. Putcha, "The axioms defining a biordered set are quite complicated. However, considering the general nature of semigroups, it is rather surprising that such a finite axiomatization is even possible." Since the publication of the original definition of the biordered set by Nambooripad, several variations in the definition have been proposed. David Easdown simplified the definition and formulated the axioms in a special arrow notation invented by him.

== Definition ==
=== Preliminaries ===
If X and Y are sets and ρ ⊆ X × Y, let ρ (y) = { x ∈ X : x ρ y }.

Let E be a set in which a partial binary operation, indicated by juxtaposition, is defined. If D_{E} is the domain of the partial binary operation on E then D_{E} is a relation on E and (e,f) is in D_{E} if and only if the product ef exists in E. The following relations can be defined in E:

$$\omega^r = \{(e,f) \, :\, fe = e\}$$
$$\omega^l = \{ (e,f)\, :\, ef = e \}$$
$$R = \omega^r\, \cap \, (\omega^r)^{-1}$$
$$L = \omega^l\, \cap \, (\omega^l)^{-1}$$
$$\omega = \omega^r \, \cap \, \omega^l$$

If T is any statement about E involving the partial binary operation and the above relations in E, one can define the left-right dual of T denoted by T*. If D_{E} is symmetric then T* is meaningful whenever T is.

=== Formal definition ===
The set E is called a biordered set if the following axioms and their duals hold for arbitrary elements e, f, g, etc. in E.

(B1) ω^{r} and ω^{l} are reflexive and transitive relations on E and D_{E} = (ω^{r} ∪ ω^{l}) ∪ (ω^{r} ∪ ω^{l})^{−1}.

(B21) If f is in ω^{r}(e) then f R fe ω e.

(B22) If g ω^{l} f and if f and g are in ω^{r} (e) then ge ω^{l} fe.

(B31) If g ω^{r} f and f ω^{r} e then gf = (ge)f.

(B32) If g ω^{l} f and if f and g are in ω^{r} (e) then (fg)e = (fe)(ge).

In M (e, f) = ω^{l} (e) ∩ ω^{r} (f) (the M-set of e and f in that order), define a relation $\prec$ by

$$g \prec h\quad \Longleftrightarrow  \quad eg \,\,\omega^r\,\, eh\,,\,\,\,   gf\,\, \omega^l \,\,hf$$.

Then the set

$$S(e,f) = \{ h\in M(e,f) : g\prec h \text{ for all } g\in M(e,f) \}$$

is called the sandwich set of e and f in that order.

(B4) If f and g are in ω^{r} (e) then S(f, g)e = S (fe, ge).

=== M-biordered sets and regular biordered sets ===
We say that a biordered set E is an M-biordered set if M (e, f) ≠ ∅ for all e and f in E. Also, E is called a regular biordered set if S (e, f) ≠ ∅ for all e and f in E.

In 2012 Roman S. Gigoń gave a simple proof that M-biordered sets arise from E-inversive semigroups.

== Subobjects and morphisms ==
=== Biordered subsets ===
A subset F of a biordered set E is a biordered subset (subboset) of E if F is a biordered set under the partial binary operation inherited from E.

For any e in E the sets ω^{r} (e), ω^{l} (e) and ω (e) are biordered subsets of E.

=== Bimorphisms ===
A mapping φ : E → F between two biordered sets E and F is a biordered set homomorphism (also called a bimorphism) if for all (e, f) in D_{E} we have (eφ) (fφ) = (ef)φ.

== Illustrative examples ==
=== Vector space example ===
Let V be a vector space and

E = {(A, B) |V = A ⊕ B}

where V = A ⊕ B means that A and B are subspaces of V and V is the internal direct sum of A and B. The partial binary operation ⋆ on E defined by

(A, B) ⋆ (C, D) = (A + ( B ∩ C), (B + C) ∩ D )

makes E a biordered set. The quasiorders in E are characterised as follows:

(A, B) ω^{r} (C, D) ⇔ A ⊇ C
(A, B) ω^{l} (C, D) ⇔ B ⊆ D

=== Biordered set of a semigroup ===
The set E of idempotents in a semigroup S becomes a biordered set if a partial binary operation is defined in E as follows: ef is defined in E if and only if ef = e or ef = f or fe = e or fe = f holds in S. If S is a regular semigroup then E is a regular biordered set.

As a concrete example, let S be the semigroup of all mappings of X = { 1, 2, 3 } into itself. Let the symbol (abc) denote the map for which 1 → a, 2 → b, and 3 → c. The set E of idempotents in S contains the following elements:

(111), (222), (333) (constant maps)

(122), (133), (121), (323), (113), (223)

(123) (identity map)

The following table (taking composition of mappings in the diagram order) describes the partial binary operation in E. An X in a cell indicates that the corresponding multiplication is not defined.

∗	(111)	(222)	(333)	(122)	(133)	(121)	(323)	(113)	(223)	(123)
(111)	(111)	(222)	(333)	(111)	(111)	(111)	(333)	(111)	(222)	(111)
(222)	(111)	(222)	(333)	(222)	(333)	(222)	(222)	(111)	(222)	(222)
(333)	(111)	(222)	(333)	(222)	(333)	(111)	(333)	(333)	(333)	(333)
(122)	(111)	(222)	(333)	(122)	(133)	(122)	No	No	No	(122)
(133)	(111)	(222)	(333)	(122)	(133)	No	No	(133)	No	(133)
(121)	(111)	(222)	(333)	(121)	No	(121)	(323)	No	No	(121)
(323)	(111)	(222)	(333)	No	No	(121)	(323)	No	(323)	(323)
(113)	(111)	(222)	(333)	No	(113)	No	No	(113)	(223)	(113)
(223)	(111)	(222)	(333)	No	No	No	(223)	(113)	(223)	(223)
(123)	(111)	(222)	(333)	(122)	(133)	(121)	(323)	(113)	(223)	(123)
