= Principal factor =

In algebra, the principal factor of a $\mathcal{J}$-class J of a semigroup S is equal to J if J is the kernel of S, and to $J \cup \{0\}$ otherwise.

== Properties ==
- A principal factor is a simple, 0-simple or null semigroup.
