= Chandroth Vasudevan Radhakrishnan =

Indian software developer (b. 1953)

CV Radhakrishnan
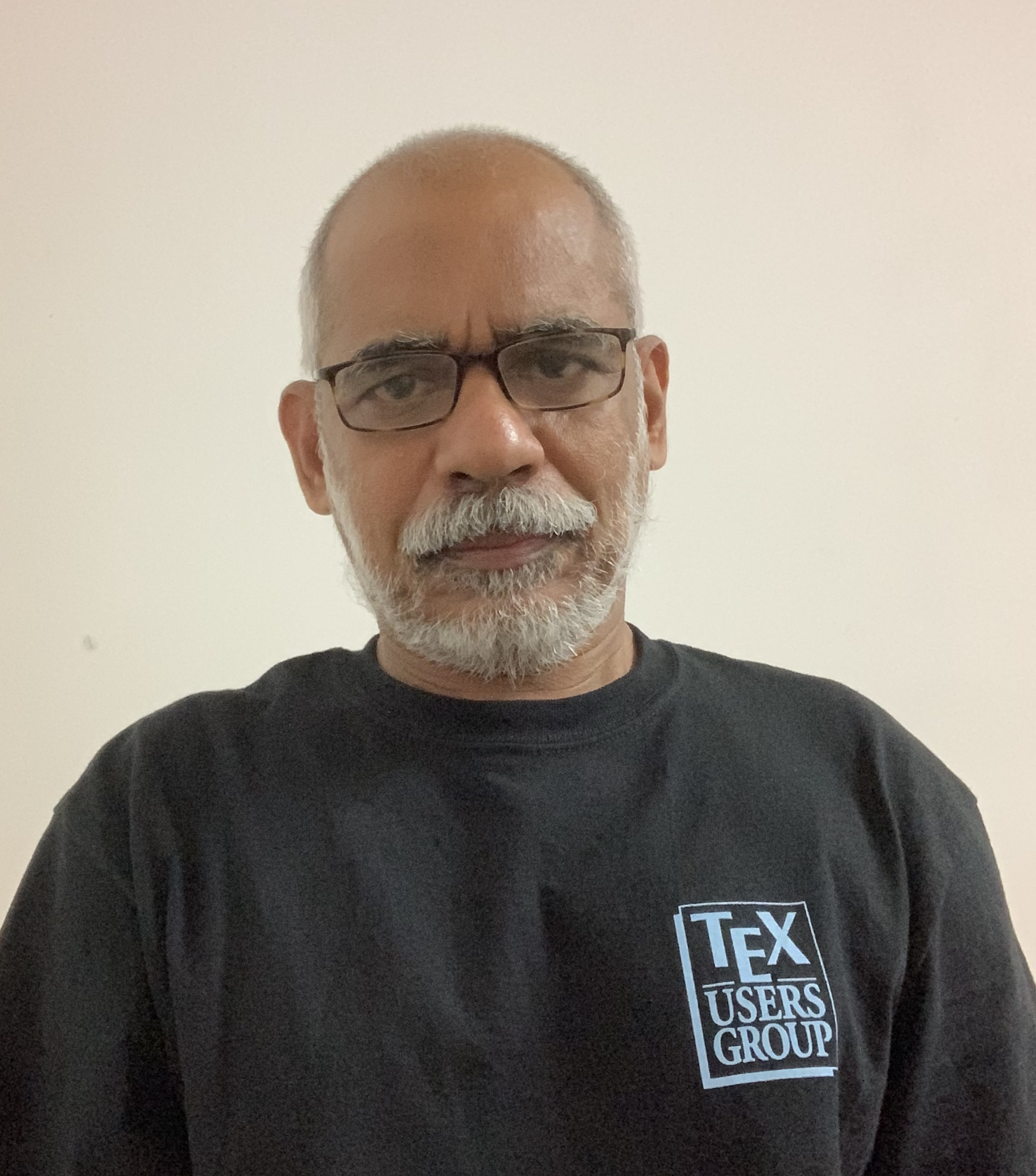
- CV Radhakrishnan at STMDocs campus in August, 2019
- Born: 1953 (age 72–73); Kuzhithurai, Kanyakumari, Tamil Nadu, India
- Citizenship: Indian
- Education: Graduate
- Alma mater: Christian College, Marthandam
- Occupation: Software developer
- Organization: River Valley Technologies
- Known for: Setting up of Indian TeX Users Group and Free Software Foundation of India
- Movement: Free software and open access publishing
- Spouse: Vidhya
- Website: www.cvr.cc

Chandroth Vasudevan Radhakrishnan (Malayalam: ചന്ദ്രോത്ത് വാസുദേവൻ രാധാകൃഷ്ണൻ) aka CV Radhakrishnan aka CVR (born 20 January 1953), is an Indian free software developer, entrepreneur and the Founder of River Valley Technologies. He is also one of the founding members of TeX Users Group in India.

== Early life ==
The eldest of four children, CV Radhakrishnan was born on 20 January 1953 in the village of Kuzhithurai in Kanyakumari district, now part of the state of Tamil Nadu, India.

== Career ==
Radhakrishnan started his career at the Indian Telecom department where he worked briefly for six months in 1973. From there, he moved to Delhi and joined the Ministry of Shipping and Transport. While working in Delhi, he experienced a weakness in his leg muscles and was diagnosed with a neurological disorder known as peroneal muscular dystrophy. Informed by the doctors that he could not expect to live beyond five years, he quit his job and returned to Kerala to stay with his parents. In Kerala, he joined the administrative department of Kerala University. He continued there for the next fifteen years until he quit in 1993 to set up River Valley Technologies.

== TeX and free software ==
CV Radhakrishnan began to learn about computers during his stint at Kerala University. Having no formal training in them, he took it up as a way to distract himself from his disease. During this time, his job at the university got him acquainted with Prof. K. S. S. Nambooripad of the Department of Mathematics. The professor, an ardent TeX lover, introduced Radhakrishnan to the TeX language. Radhakrishnan soon started exploring the possibilities of the TeX language. Beginning with research papers of the university students, he went on to apply TeX in typesetting Entomon, an entomology research journal of the Department of Zoology. In 1994, he set up River Valley Technologies as a proprietary firm offering typesetting services.

Radhakrishnan's involvement with the Free Software movement started with the inauguration of the Indian TeX Users Group at Trivandrum in January 1998. He was nominated as the secretary of the Indian TeX users group during the meeting. Around this time, FreeDevelopers.Net, a commercial company based in Washington was incorporated. Richard Stallman was its Chief Ethical Officer. The prime aim of FreeDevelopers.Net was to function as a democratic entity that stood for the development of free software. Radhakrishnan founded the Indian chapter of Free Software Foundation on 20 July 2001. Radhakrishan maintains a number of LaTeX packages in CTAN.

== River Valley Technologies ==
River Valley Technologies came into existence on the premises of the Software Technology Park (STP) in Trivandrum on 1 January 1994. Started as a proprietary concern dealing with software and IT enabled services and registered under the STP system, the firm soon began providing typesetting services to major publishing houses. In 2003, River Valley Technologies contributed to the timely publication of BSNL's telephone directory. Later, Radhakrishnan registered a new private limited company that came to be known as STM Document Engineering Pvt Ltd (STMDocs).

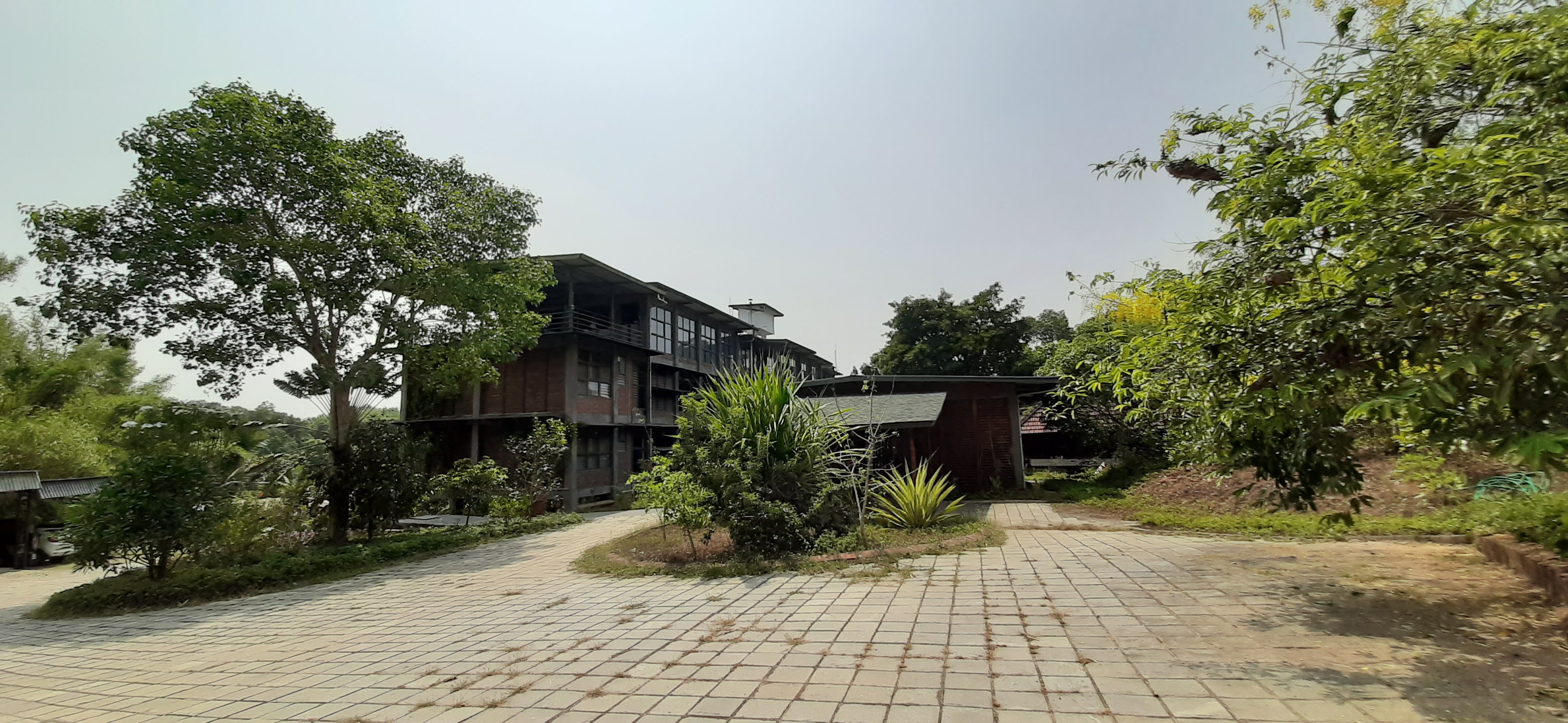
STMDocs Office Campus at Malayinkeezhu in March 2020

Working completely on free software, STMDocs is one of the main suppliers of Elsevier and has also provided typesetting services to Nature, Institute of Physics & Cambridge University Press. Sprawled across a green stretch of four acres, the main campus of the company is located at Malayinkeezhu, a village located 15 km from the city of Thiruvananthapuram. Radhakrishnan has designed the campus to be an eco sanctuary that houses a range of bio-diverse species from exotic trees to birds and bees. Running on renewable energy and rain water harvesting and actively practising organic farming, the company won the Special Jury award for Biodiversity from the Kerala State Biodiversity Board in 2019.

== Philanthropy ==
Radhakrishnan supports philanthropic efforts through non-profit projects spearheaded by the Sayahna Foundation, a virtual community set up by him to promote open access publishing and collaborative digitisation of all contents that enrich humanity, culture, heritage and history. Sayahna has contributed to the digitization of prominent works of literature. The digitized version of Kerala Panineeyam, a treatise on Malayalam grammar and rhetoric was released under Creative Commons ShareAlike License in 2017.

== Personal life ==
Radhakrishnan is married and lives in Thiruvananthapuram, Kerala.
