= Anton Sushkevich =

Russian mathematician (1889 to 1961)

Anton Kazimirovich Suschkewitsch
- Антон Казимирович Сушкевич
- Born: 23 January 1889; Borisoglebsk, Southern Russia
- Died: 30 August 1961 (aged 72)
- Education: Berlin University, St Petersburg University, Kharkov University
- Known for: First semigroup-theorist in the world
- Scientific career
- Fields: Mathematician
- Workplaces: Kharkov University

Anton Kazimirovich Sushkevich (Антон Казимирович Сушкевич) (23 January 1889, Borisoglebsk, Russia — 30 August 1961, Kharkiv, Ukraine) was a Russian mathematician and textbook author who expanded group theory to include semigroups and other magmas.

Sushkevich attended secondary school in Voronezh and studied in Berlin from 1906 to 1911. There he attended lectures of F. G. Frobenius, Issai Schur, and Hermann Schwarz. Sushkevich studied piano with L. V. Rostropovich, father of Mstislav Rostropovich. In 1906 he was a cello student at Stern Conservatory (now part of Berlin University of the Arts). In 1911 he moved to Saint Petersburg, graduating from the Imperial University in 1913.

Moving to Kharkiv, Suskevich taught in secondary education while he pursued a graduate degree at Kharkov State University. His dissertation was The theory of operations as the general theory of groups. Obtaining the degree, he became an assistant professor at the university in 1918, and adjunct professor in 1920. Voronezh State University employed Sushkevich in 1921 as professor of mathematics. He published the first edition of his Higher Algebra (1923). He published a generalization of Cayley's theorem for certain finite semigroups in 1926. The next year he was in Moscow for the Russian Mathematical Congress, and the following year in Bologna for the International Congress of Mathematicians.

In Kharkiv, the Ukrainian Scientific Research Institute of Mathematics and Mechanics was established in 1929 with Sushkevich as a member. With a rising interest in abstract algebra, he wrote a second book on algebra: Foundations of Higher Algebra which was published both in Russian and Ukrainian. In 1933 he directed the Algebra & Number Theory section of Kharkov State University's department of mathematics. At that time Stalin caused a famine in Ukraine, the Holodomor, killing millions especially in rural areas. Suskevich survived to edit new editions of his textbook that included "new algebra": fields, integral domains, rings, ideals, and quaternions. His original work, The Theory of Generalized Groups (1937) opened up the area of semigroups. According to biographer Hollings, "He sought to describe his semigroups of interest in terms of certain of their subgroups: from Sushkevich's point of view, groups were objects of known structure."

== Selected works ==
- 1928: "Über die endlichen Gruppen ohne das Gesetz der eindeutigen Umkehrbarkeit", Mathematische Annalen, 99 (1): 30–50, doi:10.1007/BF01459084, hdl:10338.dmlcz/100078, ISSN 0025-5831, MR 1512437.
- 1929: "On a generalization of the associative law", Transactions of the American Mathematical Society 31(1):204–14 doi:10.1090/S0002-9947-1929-1501476-0 MR 1501476
- 1951: "Materials for the History of Algebra in Russia in the 19th and beginning of the 20th centuries", MR 0051749
- 1954: Theory of Numbers, second edition 1956 MR 0091286
