= Sandy Green (mathematician) =

British mathematician (1926–2014)

- Born: 26 February 1926; Rochester, New York, US
- Died: 7 April 2014 (aged 88)
- Citizenship: British, American
- Education: University of St Andrews; St John's College, Cambridge
- Known for: Work on group representation theory, Green's relations
- Awards: Senior Berwick Prize (1984) de Morgan Medal (2001)
- Scientific career
- Fields: Mathematics
- Workplaces: Bletchley Park University of Manchester; University of Sussex University of Warwick
- Doctoral advisor: Philip Hall, David Rees
- Doctoral students: Perdita Stevens

James Alexander "Sandy" Green FRS (26 February 1926 – 7 April 2014) was a mathematician and professor at the Mathematics Institute at the University of Warwick, who worked in the field of representation theory.

== Early life ==
Sandy Green was born in February 1926 in Rochester, New York, but moved to Toronto with his emigrant Scottish parents later that year. The family returned to Britain in May 1935 when his father, Frederick C. Green, took up the Drapers Professorship of French at the University of Cambridge.

== Education ==
Green was educated at the Perse School, Cambridge. He won a scholarship to the University of St Andrews and matriculated aged 16 in 1942. He took an ordinary BSc in 1944, and then, after scientific service in the war, was awarded a BSc Honours in 1947. He gained his PhD at St John's College, Cambridge in 1951, under the supervision of Philip Hall and David Rees.

== Career ==
=== World War II ===
In the summer of 1944, he was conscripted for national scientific service at the age of eighteen, and was assigned to work at Bletchley Park, where he acted as a human computer carrying out calculations in Hut F, the "Newmanry", a department led by Max Newman, which used special-purpose Colossus computers to assist in breaking German naval codes.

=== Academic work ===
His first lecturing post (1950) was at the University of Manchester, where Newman was his Head of department. In 1964 he became a Reader at the University of Sussex, and then in 1965 was appointed as a professor at the newly formed Mathematics Institute at Warwick University, where he led the algebra group. He spent several periods as a visiting academic in the United States, beginning with a year at the Institute for Advanced Study in Princeton, New Jersey in 1960–61, as well as similar visits to universities in France, Germany and Portugal. After retiring from Warwick he became a member of the faculty and Professor Emeritus at the Mathematics Institute of the University of Oxford, in whose meetings he participated actively.

== Work in mathematics ==
According to the Fields Medallist John G. Thompson, Green showed, in two important papers, that information about finite groups can be derived from knowledge about indecomposable modules of p-groups.

Green found all the characters of general linear groups over finite fields (Green 1955) and invented the Green correspondence in modular representation theory. Both Green functions in the representation theory of groups of Lie type and Green's relations in the area of semigroups are named after him. His final publication (2007) was a revised and augmented edition of his 1980 work, Polynomial Representations of GL(n).

== Personal life ==
Green met his wife, Margaret Lord, at Bletchley Park, where she worked as a Colossus operator, also in the Newmanry section (Hut F). The couple married in August 1950, and had two daughters and a son.

== Honours ==
He was elected to the Royal Society of Edinburgh in 1968 and the Royal Society in 1987 and was awarded two London Mathematical Society prizes: the Senior Berwick Prize in 1984 and the de Morgan Medal in 2001.

== Bibliography ==
- (1955) The characters of the finite general linear group, Trans. A. M. S. 80 402–447.
- (2007) Polynomial Representations of GL_n, Lecture Notes in Mathematics, Springer, Vol. 830. 2nd edition with an Appendix on Schensted Correspondence and Littelmann Paths, K. Erdmann, J. A. Green and M. Shocker
