= Compact semigroup =

In mathematics, a compact semigroup is a semigroup in which the sets of solutions to equations can be described by finite sets of equations. The term "compact" here does not refer to any topology on the semigroup.

Let S be a semigroup and X a finite set of letters. A system of equations is a subset E of the Cartesian product X^{∗} × X^{∗} of the free monoid (finite strings) over X with itself. The system E is satisfiable in S if there is a map f from X to S, which extends to a semigroup morphism f from X^{+} to S, such that for all (u,v) in E we have f(u) = f(v) in S. Such an f is a solution, or satisfying assignment, for the system E.

Two systems of equations are equivalent if they have the same set of satisfying assignments. A system of equations if independent if it is not equivalent to a proper subset of itself. A semigroup is compact if every independent system of equations is finite.

== Examples ==
- A free monoid on a finite alphabet is compact.
- A free monoid on a countable alphabet is compact.
- A finitely generated free group is compact.
- A trace monoid on a finite set of generators is compact.
- The bicyclic monoid is not compact.

== Properties ==
- The class of compact semigroups is closed under taking subsemigroups and finite direct products.
- The class of compact semigroups is not closed under taking morphic images or infinite direct products.

== Varieties ==
The class of compact semigroups does not form an equational variety. However, a variety of monoids has the property that all its members are compact if and only if all finitely generated members satisfy the maximal condition on congruences (any family of congruences, ordered by inclusion, has a maximal element).
