= Regular semigroup =

In mathematics, a regular semigroup is a semigroup S in which every element is regular, i.e., for each element a in S there exists an element x in S such that axa = a. Regular semigroups are one of the most-studied classes of semigroups, and their structure is particularly amenable to study via Green's relations.

== History ==
Regular semigroups were introduced by J. A. Green in his influential 1951 paper "On the structure of semigroups"; this was also the paper in which Green's relations were introduced. The concept of regularity in a semigroup was adapted from an analogous condition for rings, already considered by John von Neumann. It was Green's study of regular semigroups which led him to define his celebrated relations. According to a footnote in Green 1951, the suggestion that the notion of regularity be applied to semigroups was first made by David Rees.

The term inversive semigroup (French: demi-groupe inversif) was historically used as synonym in the papers of Gabriel Thierrin (a student of Paul Dubreil) in the 1950s, and it is still used occasionally.

== The basics ==
There are two equivalent ways in which to define a regular semigroup S:

(1) for each a in S, there is an x in S, which is called a pseudoinverse, with axa = a;
(2) every element a has at least one inverse b, in the sense that aba = a and bab = b.

To see the equivalence of these definitions, first suppose that S is defined by (2). Then b serves as the required x in (1). Conversely, if S is defined by (1), then xax is an inverse for a, since a(xax)a = axa(xa) = axa = a and (xax)a(xax) = x(axa)(xax) = xa(xax) = x(axa)x = xax.

The set of inverses (in the above sense) of an element a in an arbitrary semigroup S is denoted by V(a). Thus, another way of expressing definition (2) above is to say that in a regular semigroup, V(a) is nonempty, for every a in S. The product of any element a with any b in V(a) is always idempotent: abab = ab, since aba = a.

=== Examples of regular semigroups ===
- Every group is a regular semigroup.
- Every band (idempotent semigroup) is regular in the sense of this article, though this is not what is meant by a regular band.
- The bicyclic semigroup is regular.
- Any full transformation semigroup is regular.
- A Rees matrix semigroup is regular.
- The homomorphic image of a regular semigroup is regular.

=== Unique inverses and unique pseudoinverses ===
A regular semigroup in which idempotents commute (with idempotents) is an inverse semigroup, or equivalently, every element has a unique inverse. To see this, let S be a regular semigroup in which idempotents commute. Then every element of S has at least one inverse. Suppose that a in S has two inverses b and c, i.e.,

aba = a, bab = b, aca = a and cac = c. Also ab, ba, ac and ca are idempotents as above.

Then

b = bab = b(aca)b = bac(a)b = bac(aca)b = bac(ac)(ab) = bac(ab)(ac) = ba(ca)bac = ca(ba)bac = c(aba)bac = cabac = cac = c.

So, by commuting the pairs of idempotents ab & ac and ba & ca, the inverse of a is shown to be unique. Conversely, it can be shown that any inverse semigroup is a regular semigroup in which idempotents commute.

The existence of a unique pseudoinverse implies the existence of a unique inverse, but the opposite is not true. For example, in the symmetric inverse semigroup, the empty transformation Ø does not have a unique pseudoinverse, because Ø = ØfØ for any transformation f. The inverse of Ø is unique however, because only one f satisfies the additional constraint that f = fØf, namely f = Ø. This remark holds more generally in any semigroup with zero. Furthermore, if every element has a unique pseudoinverse, then the semigroup is a group, and the unique pseudoinverse of an element coincides with the group inverse.

== Green's relations ==
Recall that the principal ideals of a semigroup S are defined in terms of S^{1}, the semigroup with identity adjoined; this is to ensure that an element a belongs to the principal right, left and two-sided ideals which it generates. In a regular semigroup S, however, an element a = axa automatically belongs to these ideals, without recourse to adjoining an identity. Green's relations can therefore be redefined for regular semigroups as follows:

$a\,\mathcal{L}\,b$ if, and only if, Sa = Sb;
$a\,\mathcal{R}\,b$ if, and only if, aS = bS;
$a\,\mathcal{J}\,b$ if, and only if, SaS = SbS.

In a regular semigroup S, every $\mathcal{L}$- and $\mathcal{R}$-class contains at least one idempotent. If a is any element of S and a′ is any inverse for a, then a is $\mathcal{L}$-related to a′a and $\mathcal{R}$-related to aa′.

Theorem. Let S be a regular semigroup; let a and b be elements of S, and let V(x) denote the set of inverses of x in S. Then

- $a\,\mathcal{L}\,b$ iff there exist a′ in V(a) and b′ in V(b) such that a′a = b′b;
- $a\,\mathcal{R}\,b$ iff there exist a′ in V(a) and b′ in V(b) such that aa′ = bb′,
- $a\,\mathcal{H}\,b$ iff there exist a′ in V(a) and b′ in V(b) such that a′a = b′b and aa′ = bb′.

If S is an inverse semigroup, then the idempotent in each $\mathcal{L}$- and $\mathcal{R}$-class is unique.

== Special classes of regular semigroups ==
Some special classes of regular semigroups are:

- Locally inverse semigroups: a regular semigroup S is locally inverse if eSe is an inverse semigroup, for each idempotent e.
- Orthodox semigroups: a regular semigroup S is orthodox if its subset of idempotents forms a subsemigroup.
- Generalised inverse semigroups: a regular semigroup S is called a generalised inverse semigroup if its idempotents form a normal band, i.e., xyzx = xzyx for all idempotents x, y, z.

The class of generalised inverse semigroups is the intersection of the class of locally inverse semigroups and the class of orthodox semigroups.

All inverse semigroups are orthodox and locally inverse. The converse statements do not hold.

== Generalizations ==
- eventually regular semigroup
- E-dense (aka E-inversive) semigroup

== See also ==
- Biordered set
- Special classes of semigroups
- Nambooripad order
- Generalized inverse

== Sources ==
- Clifford, Alfred Hoblitzelle; Preston, Gordon Bamford (2010) [1967]. The algebraic theory of semigroups. Vol. 2. American Mathematical Society. ISBN 978-0-8218-0272-4.
- Howie, John Mackintosh (1995). Fundamentals of Semigroup Theory (1st ed.). Clarendon Press. ISBN 978-0-19-851194-6.
- M. Kilp, U. Knauer, A.V. Mikhalev, Monoids, Acts and Categories with Applications to Wreath Products and Graphs, De Gruyter Expositions in Mathematics vol. 29, Walter de Gruyter, 2000, ISBN 3-11-015248-7.
- J. A. Green (1951). "On the structure of semigroups". Annals of Mathematics. Second Series. 54 (1): 163–172. doi:10.2307/1969317. hdl:10338.dmlcz/100067. JSTOR 1969317.
- J. M. Howie, Semigroups, past, present and future, Proceedings of the International Conference on Algebra and Its Applications, 2002, 6–20.
- J. von Neumann (1936). "On regular rings". Proceedings of the National Academy of Sciences of the USA. 22 (12): 707–713. Bibcode:1936PNAS...22..707V. doi:10.1073/pnas.22.12.707. PMC 1076849. PMID 16577757.
