= Gordon Preston =

English mathematician (1925–2015)

- Born: 28 April 1925; Workington, United Kingdom
- Died: 14 April 2015 (aged 89); Oxford, United Kingdom
- Education: University of Oxford
- Known for: Inverse semigroups, Wagner–Preston representation theorem
- Scientific career
- Fields: Mathematics
- Workplaces: Monash University
- Thesis: Some Problems in the Theory of Ideals (1954)
- Doctoral advisor: E. C. Thomson, J. H. C. Whitehead

Gordon Bamford Preston (28 April 1925 – 14 April 2015) was an English mathematician best known for his work on semigroups. He received his D.Phil. in mathematics in 1954 from Magdalen College, Oxford.

He was born in Workington and brought up in Carlisle. During World War II, he left his undergraduate studies at Oxford University for Bletchley Park, to help crack German codes with a small group of mathematicians, which included Alan Turing. At Bletchley Park he persuaded Max Newman (who thought that the women would not care for the "intellectual effort") to authorise talks to the Wrens to explain their work mathematically, and the talks were very popular.

After graduation, he was a teacher at Westminster School, London and then the Royal Military College of Science. In 1954 he wrote three highly influential papers in the Journal of the London Mathematical Society, laying the foundations of inverse semigroup theory. Before Preston and Alfred H. Clifford's book, The Algebraic Theory of Semigroups (Vol 1 1961) (Vol 2 1967) and the Russian, Evgenii S. Lyapin's, Semigroups (1960) there was no systematic treatment of semigroups. The Algebraic Theory of Semigroups was hailed as an excellent achievement that greatly influenced the future development of the subject.

In 1963, Preston moved to Australia to take up the chair of mathematics at Monash University, Melbourne. Preston was an important contributor to algebraic semigroup theory and a respected head of school during his various Monash appointments from 1963 until his retirement in 1990.

He subsequently spent six months each year in both Oxford, UK, and Melbourne, Australia, dying on 14 April 2015 in Oxford at age 89.
