= Symmetric inverse semigroup =

In abstract algebra, the set of all partial bijections on a set X (a.k.a. one-to-one partial transformations) forms an inverse semigroup, called the symmetric inverse semigroup (actually a monoid) on X. The conventional notation for the symmetric inverse semigroup on a set X is $\mathcal{I}_X$ or $\mathcal{IS}_X$. In general $\mathcal{I}_X$ is not commutative.

Details about the origin of the symmetric inverse semigroup are available in the discussion on the origins of the inverse semigroup.

== Finite symmetric inverse semigroups ==
When X is a finite set {1, ..., n}, the inverse semigroup of one-to-one partial transformations is denoted by C_{n} and its elements are called charts or partial symmetries. The notion of chart generalizes the notion of permutation. A (famous) example of (sets of) charts are the hypomorphic mapping sets from the reconstruction conjecture in graph theory.

The cycle notation of classical, group-based permutations generalizes to symmetric inverse semigroups by the addition of a notion called a path, which (unlike a cycle) ends when it reaches the "undefined" element; the notation thus extended is called path notation.

== See also ==
- Symmetric group
