= Left inverse =

A left inverse in mathematics may refer to:

- A left inverse element with respect to a binary operation on a set
- A left inverse function for a mapping between sets
- A kind of generalized inverse

== See also ==
- Left-cancellative
- Loop (algebra), an algebraic structure with identity element where every element has a unique left and right inverse
- Retraction (category theory), a left inverse of some morphism
- Right inverse (disambiguation)
