= Right inverse =

A right inverse in mathematics may refer to:

- A right inverse element with respect to a binary operation on a set
- A right inverse function for a mapping between sets

== See also ==
- Right-cancellative
- Loop (algebra), an algebraic structure with identity element where every element has a unique left and right inverse
- Section (category theory), a right inverse of some morphism
- Left inverse (disambiguation)
