= Special classes of semigroups =

Families of certain algebraic structures

In mathematics, a semigroup is a nonempty set together with an associative binary operation. A special class of semigroups is a class of semigroups satisfying additional properties or conditions. Thus the class of commutative semigroups consists of all those semigroups in which the binary operation satisfies the commutativity property that ab = ba for all elements a and b in the semigroup. The class of finite semigroups consists of those semigroups for which the underlying set has finite cardinality. Members of the class of Brandt semigroups are required to satisfy not just one condition but a set of additional properties. A large collection of special classes of semigroups have been defined though not all of them have been studied equally intensively.

In the algebraic theory of semigroups, in constructing special classes, attention is focused only on those properties, restrictions and conditions which can be expressed in terms of the binary operations in the semigroups and occasionally on the cardinality and similar properties of subsets of the underlying set. The underlying sets are not assumed to carry any other mathematical structures like order or topology.

As in any algebraic theory, one of the main problems of the theory of semigroups is the classification of all semigroups and a complete description of their structure. In the case of semigroups, since the binary operation is required to satisfy only the associativity property the problem of classification is considered extremely difficult. Descriptions of structures have been obtained for certain special classes of semigroups. For example, the structure of the sets of idempotents of regular semigroups is completely known. Structure descriptions are presented in terms of better known types of semigroups. The best known type of semigroup is the group.

A (necessarily incomplete) list of various special classes of semigroups is presented below. To the extent possible the defining properties are formulated in terms of the binary operations in the semigroups. The references point to the locations from where the defining properties are sourced.

== Notations ==
In describing the defining properties of the various special classes of semigroups, the following notational conventions are adopted.

Notations
| Notation | Meaning |
|---|---|
| S | Arbitrary semigroup |
| E | Set of idempotents in S |
| G | Group of units in S |
| I | Minimal ideal of S |
| V | Regular elements of S |
| X | Arbitrary set |
| a, b, c | Arbitrary elements of S |
| x, y, z | Specific elements of S |
| e, f, g | Arbitrary elements of E |
| h | Specific element of E |
| l, m, n | Arbitrary positive integers |
| j, k | Specific positive integers |
| v, w | Arbitrary elements of V |
| 0 | Zero element of S |
| 1 | Identity element of S |
| S^{1} | S if 1 ∈ S; S ∪ { 1 } if 1 ∉ S |
| a ≤_{L} b a ≤_{R} b a ≤_{H} b a ≤_{J} b | S^{1}a ⊆ S^{1}b aS^{1} ⊆ bS^{1} S^{1}a ⊆ S^{1}b and aS^{1} ⊆ bS^{1} S^{1}aS^{1} ⊆ S^{1}bS^{1} |
| L, R, H, D, J | Green's relations |
| L_{a}, R_{a}, H_{a}, D_{a}, J_{a} | Green classes containing a |
| $x^\omega$ | The only power of x which is idempotent. This element exists, assuming the semigroup is (locally) finite. See variety of finite semigroups for more information about this notation. |
| $|X|$ | The cardinality of X, assuming X is finite. |

For example, the definition xab = xba should be read as:

- There exists x an element of the semigroup such that, for each a and b in the semigroup, xab and xba are equal.

== List of special classes of semigroups ==
The third column states whether this set of semigroups forms a variety. And whether the set of finite semigroups of this special class forms a variety of finite semigroups. Note that if this set is a variety, its set of finite elements is automatically a variety of finite semigroups.

List of special classes of semigroups
| Terminology | Defining property | Variety of finite semigroup | Reference(s) |
|---|---|---|---|
| Finite semigroup | S is a finite set. | Not infinite; Finite | |
| Empty semigroup | S = $\emptyset$ | No | |
| Trivial semigroup | Cardinality of S is 1. | Infinite; Finite | |
| Monoid | 1 ∈ S | No | Gril p. 3 |
| Band (Idempotent semigroup) | a^{2} = a | Infinite; Finite | C&P p. 4 |
| Rectangular band | A band such that aba = a | Infinite; Finite | Fennemore |
| Normal band | A band such that abca = acba | Infinite; Finite | Fennemore |
| Semilattice | A commutative band, that is: a^{2} = a; ab = ba | Infinite; Finite | C&P p. 24; Fennemore |
| Commutative semigroup | ab = ba | Infinite; Finite | C&P p. 3 |
| Archimedean commutative semigroup | ab = ba; There exists x and k such that a^{k} = xb. | | C&P p. 131 |
| Nowhere commutative semigroup | ab = ba ⇒ a = b | | C&P p. 26 |
| Left weakly commutative | There exist x and k such that (ab)^{k} = bx. | | Nagy p. 59 |
| Right weakly commutative | There exist x and k such that (ab)^{k} = xa. | | Nagy p. 59 |
| Weakly commutative | Left and right weakly commutative. That is: There exist x and j such that (ab)^{j} = bx.; There exist y and k such that (ab)^{k} = ya. | | Nagy p. 59 |
| Conditionally commutative semigroup | If ab = ba then axb = bxa for all x. | | Nagy p. 77 |
| R-commutative semigroup | ab R ba | | Nagy p. 69–71 |
| RC-commutative semigroup | R-commutative and conditionally commutative | | Nagy p. 93–107 |
| L-commutative semigroup | ab L ba | | Nagy p. 69–71 |
| LC-commutative semigroup | L-commutative and conditionally commutative | | Nagy p. 93–107 |
| H-commutative semigroup | ab H ba | | Nagy p. 69–71 |
| Quasi-commutative semigroup | ab = (ba)^{k} for some k. | | Nagy p. 109 |
| Right commutative semigroup | xab = xba | | Nagy p. 137 |
| Left commutative semigroup | abx = bax | | Nagy p. 137 |
| Externally commutative semigroup | axb = bxa | | Nagy p. 175 |
| Medial semigroup | xaby = xbay | | Nagy p. 119 |
| E-k semigroup (k fixed) | (ab)^{k} = a^{k}b^{k} | Infinite; Finite | Nagy p. 183 |
| Exponential semigroup | (ab)^{m} = a^{m}b^{m} for all m | Infinite; Finite | Nagy p. 183 |
| WE-k semigroup (k fixed) | There is a positive integer j depending on the couple (a,b) such that (ab)^{k+j} = a^{k}b^{k} (ab)^{j} = (ab)^{j}a^{k}b^{k} | | Nagy p. 199 |
| Weakly exponential semigroup | WE-m for all m | | Nagy p. 215 |
| Right cancellative semigroup | ba = ca ⇒ b = c | | C&P p. 3 |
| Left cancellative semigroup | ab = ac ⇒ b = c | | C&P p. 3 |
| Cancellative semigroup | Left and right cancellative semigroup, that is: ab = ac ⇒ b = c; ba = ca ⇒ b = c | | C&P p. 3 |
| E-inversive semigroup (E-dense semigroup) | There exists x such that ax ∈ E. | | C&P p. 98 |
| Regular semigroup | There exists x such that axa =a. | | C&P p. 26 |
| Regular band | A band such that abaca = abca | Infinite; Finite | Fennemore |
| Intra-regular semigroup | There exist x and y such that xa^{2}y = a. | | C&P p. 121 |
| Left regular semigroup | There exists x such that xa^{2} = a. | | C&P p. 121 |
| Left-regular band | A band such that aba = ab | Infinite; Finite | Fennemore |
| Right regular semigroup | There exists x such that a^{2}x = a. | | C&P p. 121 |
| Right-regular band | A band such that aba = ba | Infinite; Finite | Fennemore |
| Completely regular semigroup | H_{a} is a group. | | Gril p. 75 |
| (inverse) Clifford semigroup | A regular semigroup in which all idempotents are central.; Equivalently, for finite semigroup: $a^\omega b=ba^\omega$ | Finite | Petrich p. 65 |
| k-regular semigroup (k fixed) | There exists x such that a^{k}xa^{k} = a^{k}. | | Hari |
| Eventually regular semigroup (π-regular semigroup, Quasi regular semigroup) | There exists k and x (depending on a) such that a^{k}xa^{k} = a^{k}. | | Edwa; Shum; Higg p. 49 |
| Quasi-periodic semigroup, epigroup, group-bound semigroup, completely (or strongly) π-regular semigroup, and many other; see Kela for a list) | There exists k (depending on a) such that a^{k} belongs to a subgroup of S | | Kela; Gril p. 110; Higg p. 4 |
| Primitive semigroup | If 0 ≠ e and f = ef = fe then e = f. | | C&P p. 26 |
| Unit regular semigroup | There exists u in G such that aua = a. | | Tvm |
| Strongly unit regular semigroup | There exists u in G such that aua = a.; e D f ⇒ f = v^{−1}ev for some v in G. | | Tvm |
| Orthodox semigroup | There exists x such that axa = a.; E is a subsemigroup of S. | | Gril p. 57; Howi p. 226 |
| Inverse semigroup | There exists unique x such that axa = a and xax = x. | | C&P p. 28 |
| Left inverse semigroup (R-unipotent) | R_{a} contains a unique h. | | Gril p. 382 |
| Right inverse semigroup (L-unipotent) | L_{a} contains a unique h. | | Gril p. 382 |
| Locally inverse semigroup (Pseudoinverse semigroup) | There exists x such that axa = a.; E is a pseudosemilattice. | | Gril p. 352 |
| M-inversive semigroup | There exist x and y such that baxc = bc and byac = bc. | | C&P p. 98 |
| Abundant semigroup | The classes L*_{a} and R*_{a}, where a L* b if ac = ad ⇔ bc = bd and a R* b if ca = da ⇔ cb = db, contain idempotents. | | Chen |
| Rpp-semigroup (Right principal projective semigroup) | The class L*_{a}, where a L* b if ac = ad ⇔ bc = bd, contains at least one idempotent. | | Shum |
| Lpp-semigroup (Left principal projective semigroup) | The class R*_{a}, where a R* b if ca = da ⇔ cb = db, contains at least one idempotent. | | Shum |
| Null semigroup (Zero semigroup) | 0 ∈ S; ab = 0; Equivalently ab = cd | Infinite; Finite | C&P p. 4 |
| Left zero semigroup | ab = a | Infinite; Finite | C&P p. 4 |
| Left zero band | A left zero semigroup which is a band. That is: ab = a; aa = a | Infinite; Finite | Fennemore |
| Left group | A semigroup which is left simple and right cancellative.; The direct product of a left zero semigroup and an abelian group. | | C&P p. 37, 38 |
| Right zero semigroup | ab = b | Infinite; Finite | C&P p. 4 |
| Right zero band | A right zero semigroup which is a band. That is: ab = b; aa = a | Infinite; Finite | Fennemore |
| Right group | A semigroup which is right simple and left cancellative.; The direct product of a right zero semigroup and a group. | | C&P p. 37, 38 |
| Right abelian group | A right simple and conditionally commutative semigroup.; The direct product of a right zero semigroup and an abelian group. | | Nagy p. 87 |
| Unipotent semigroup | E is singleton. | Infinite; Finite | C&P p. 21 |
| Left reductive semigroup | If xa = xb for all x then a = b. | | C&P p. 9 |
| Right reductive semigroup | If ax = bx for all x then a = b. | | C&P p. 4 |
| Reductive semigroup | If xa = xb for all x then a = b.; If ax = bx for all x then a = b. | | C&P p. 4 |
| Separative semigroup | ab = a^{2} = b^{2} ⇒ a = b | | C&P p. 130–131 |
| Reversible semigroup | Sa ∩ Sb ≠ Ø; aS ∩ bS ≠ Ø | | C&P p. 34 |
| Right reversible semigroup | Sa ∩ Sb ≠ Ø | | C&P p. 34 |
| Left reversible semigroup | aS ∩ bS ≠ Ø | | C&P p. 34 |
| Aperiodic semigroup | There exists k (depending on a) such that a^{k} = a^{k+1}; Equivalently, for finite semigroup: for each a, $a^\omega a=a^\omega$. | | KKM p. 29; Pin p. 158 |
| ω-semigroup | E is countable descending chain under the order a ≤_{H} b | | Gril p. 233–238 |
| Left Clifford semigroup (LC-semigroup) | aS ⊆ Sa | | Shum |
| Right Clifford semigroup (RC-semigroup) | Sa ⊆ aS | | Shum |
| Orthogroup | H_{a} is a group.; E is a subsemigroup of S | | Shum |
| Complete commutative semigroup | ab = ba; a^{k} is in a subgroup of S for some k.; Every nonempty subset of E has an infimum. | | Gril p. 110 |
| Nilsemigroup (Nilpotent semigroup) | 0 ∈ S; a^{k} = 0 for some integer k which depends on a.; Equivalently, for finite semigroup: for each element x and y, $yx^\omega =x^\omega=x^\omega y$. | Finite | Gril p. 99; Pin p. 148 |
| Elementary semigroup | ab = ba; S is of the form G ∪ N where; G is a group, and 1 ∈ G; N is an ideal, a nilsemigroup, and 0 ∈ N | | Gril p. 111 |
| E-unitary semigroup | There exists unique x such that axa = a and xax = x.; ea = e ⇒ a ∈ E | | Gril p. 245 |
| Finitely presented semigroup | S has a presentation ( X; R ) in which X and R are finite. | | Gril p. 134 |
| Fundamental semigroup | Equality on S is the only congruence contained in H. | | Gril p. 88 |
| Idempotent generated semigroup | S is equal to the semigroup generated by E. | | Gril p. 328 |
| Locally finite semigroup | Every finitely generated subsemigroup of S is finite. | Not infinite; Finite | Gril p. 161 |
| N-semigroup | ab = ba; There exists x and a positive integer n such that a = xb^{n}.; ax = ay ⇒ x = y; xa = ya ⇒ x = y; E = Ø | | Gril p. 100 |
| L-unipotent semigroup (Right inverse semigroup) | L_{a} contains a unique e. | | Gril p. 362 |
| R-unipotent semigroup (Left inverse semigroup) | R_{a} contains a unique e. | | Gril p. 362 |
| Left simple semigroup | L_{a} = S | | Gril p. 57 |
| Right simple semigroup | R_{a} = S | | Gril p. 57 |
| Subelementary semigroup | ab = ba; S = C ∪ N where C is a cancellative semigroup, N is a nilsemigroup or a one-element semigroup.; N is ideal of S.; Zero of N is 0 of S.; For x, y in S and c in C, cx = cy implies that x = y. | | Gril p. 134 |
| Symmetric semigroup (Full transformation semigroup) | Set of all mappings of X into itself with composition of mappings as binary operation. | | C&P p. 2 |
| Weakly reductive semigroup | If xz = yz and zx = zy for all z in S then x = y. | | C&P p. 11 |
| Right unambiguous semigroup | If x, y ≥_{R} z then x ≥_{R} y or y ≥_{R} x. | | Gril p. 170 |
| Left unambiguous semigroup | If x, y ≥_{L} z then x ≥_{L} y or y ≥_{L} x. | | Gril p. 170 |
| Unambiguous semigroup | If x, y ≥_{R} z then x ≥_{R} y or y ≥_{R} x.; If x, y ≥_{L} z then x ≥_{L} y or y ≥_{L} x. | | Gril p. 170 |
| Left 0-unambiguous | 0∈ S; 0 ≠ x ≤_{L} y, z ⇒ y ≤_{L} z or z ≤_{L} y | | Gril p. 178 |
| Right 0-unambiguous | 0∈ S; 0 ≠ x ≤_{R} y, z ⇒ y ≤_{L} z or z ≤_{R} y | | Gril p. 178 |
| 0-unambiguous semigroup | 0∈ S; 0 ≠ x ≤_{L} y, z ⇒ y ≤_{L} z or z ≤_{L} y; 0 ≠ x ≤_{R} y, z ⇒ y ≤_{L} z or z ≤_{R} y | | Gril p. 178 |
| Left Putcha semigroup | a ∈ bS^{1} ⇒ a^{n} ∈ b^{2}S^{1} for some n. | | Nagy p. 35 |
| Right Putcha semigroup | a ∈ S^{1}b ⇒ a^{n} ∈ S^{1}b^{2} for some n. | | Nagy p. 35 |
| Putcha semigroup | a ∈ S^{1}b S^{1} ⇒ a^{n} ∈ S^{1}b^{2}S^{1} for some positive integer n | | Nagy p. 35 |
| Bisimple semigroup (D-simple semigroup) | D_{a} = S | | C&P p. 49 |
| 0-bisimple semigroup | 0 ∈ S; S - {0} is a D-class of S. | | C&P p. 76 |
| Completely simple semigroup | There exists no A ⊆ S, A ≠ S such that SA ⊆ A and AS ⊆ A.; There exists h in E such that whenever hf = f and fh = f we have h = f. | | C&P p. 76 |
| Completely 0-simple semigroup | 0 ∈ S; S^{2} ≠ 0; If A ⊆ S is such that AS ⊆ A and SA ⊆ A then A = 0 or A = S.; There exists non-zero h in E such that whenever hf = f, fh = f and f ≠ 0 we have h = f. | | C&P p. 76 |
| D-simple semigroup (Bisimple semigroup) | D_{a} = S | | C&P p. 49 |
| Semisimple semigroup | Let J(a) = S^{1}aS^{1}, I(a) = J(a) − J_{a}. Each Rees factor semigroup J(a)/I(a) is 0-simple or simple. | | C&P p. 71–75 |
| $\mathbf{CS}$: Simple semigroup | J_{a} = S. (There exists no A ⊆ S, A ≠ S such that SA ⊆ A and AS ⊆ A.), equivalently, for finite semigroup: $a^{\omega}a=a$ and $(aba)^\omega=a^\omega$. | Finite | C&P p. 5; Higg p. 16; Pin pp. 151, 158 |
| 0-simple semigroup | 0 ∈ S; S^{2} ≠ 0; If A ⊆ S is such that AS ⊆ A and SA ⊆ A then A = 0. | | C&P p. 67 |
| Left 0-simple semigroup | 0 ∈ S; S^{2} ≠ 0; If A ⊆ S is such that SA ⊆ A then A = 0. | | C&P p. 67 |
| Right 0-simple semigroup | 0 ∈ S; S^{2} ≠ 0; If A ⊆ S is such that AS ⊆ A then A = 0. | | C&P p. 67 |
| Cyclic semigroup (Monogenic semigroup) | S = { w, w^{2}, w^{3}, ... } for some w in S | Not infinite; Not finite | C&P p. 19 |
| Periodic semigroup | { a, a^{2}, a^{3}, ... } is a finite set. | Not infinite; Finite | C&P p. 20 |
| Bicyclic semigroup | 1 ∈ S; S admits the presentation $\langle x,y\mid xy=1\rangle$. | | C&P p. 43–46 |
| Full transformation semigroup T_{X} (Symmetric semigroup) | Set of all mappings of X into itself with composition of mappings as binary operation. | | C&P p. 2 |
| Rectangular band | A band such that aba = a; Equivalently abc = ac | Infinite; Finite | Fennemore |
| Rectangular semigroup | Whenever three of ax, ay, bx, by are equal, all four are equal. | | C&P p. 97 |
| Symmetric inverse semigroup I_{X} | The semigroup of one-to-one partial transformations of X. | | C&P p. 29 |
| Brandt semigroup | 0 ∈ S; ( ac = bc ≠ 0 or ca = cb ≠ 0 ) ⇒ a = b; ( ab ≠ 0 and bc ≠ 0 ) ⇒ abc ≠ 0; If a ≠ 0 there exist unique x, y, z, such that xa = a, ay = a, za = y.; ( e ≠ 0 and f ≠ 0 ) ⇒ eSf ≠ 0. | | C&P p. 101 |
| Free semigroup F_{X} | Set of finite sequences of elements of X with the operation ( x_{1}, ..., x_{m} ) ( y_{1}, ..., y_{n} ) = ( x_{1}, ..., x_{m}, y_{1}, ..., y_{n} ) | | Gril p. 18 |
| Rees matrix semigroup | G^{0} a group G with 0 adjoined.; P : Λ × I → G^{0} a map.; Define an operation in I × G^{0} × Λ by ( i, g, λ ) ( j, h, μ ) = ( i, g P( λ, j ) h, μ ).; ( I, G^{0}, Λ )/( I × { 0 } × Λ ) is the Rees matrix semigroup M^{0} ( G^{0}; I, Λ ; P ). | | C&P p.88 |
| Semigroup of linear transformations | Semigroup of linear transformations of a vector space V over a field F under composition of functions. | | C&P p.57 |
| Semigroup of binary relations B_{X} | Set of all binary relations on X under composition | | C&P p.13 |
| Numerical semigroup | 0 ∈ S ⊆ N = { 0,1,2, ... } under + .; N - S is finite | | Delg |
| Semigroup with involution (*-semigroup) | There exists a unary operation a → a* in S such that a** = a and (ab)* = b*a*. | | Howi |
| Baer–Levi semigroup | Semigroup of one-to-one transformations f of X such that X − f ( X ) is infinite. | | C&P II Ch.8 |
| U-semigroup | There exists a unary operation a → a’ in S such that ( a’)’ = a. | | Howi p.102 |
| I-semigroup | There exists a unary operation a → a’ in S such that ( a’)’ = a and aa’a = a. | | Howi p.102 |
| Semiband | A regular semigroup generated by its idempotents. | | Howi p.230 |
| Group | There exists h such that for all a, ah = ha = a.; There exists x (depending on a) such that ax = xa = h. | Not infinite; Finite | |
| Topological semigroup | A semigroup which is also a topological space. Such that the semigroup product is continuous. | Not applicable | Pin p. 130 |
| Syntactic semigroup | The smallest finite monoid which can recognize a subset of another semigroup. | | Pin p. 14 |
| $\mathbf R$: the R-trivial monoids | R-trivial. That is, each R-equivalence class is trivial.; Equivalently, for finite semigroup: $(ab)^\omega a=(ab)^\omega$. | Finite | Pin p. 158 |
| $\mathbf L$: the L-trivial monoids | L-trivial. That is, each L-equivalence class is trivial.; Equivalently, for finite monoids, $b(ab)^\omega=(ab)^\omega$. | Finite | Pin p. 158 |
| $\mathbf J$: the J-trivial monoids | Monoids which are J-trivial. That is, each J-equivalence class is trivial.; Equivalently, the monoids which are L-trivial and R-trivial. | Finite | Pin p. 158 |
| $\mathbf{R_1}$: idempotent and R-trivial monoids | R-trivial. That is, each R-equivalence class is trivial.; Equivalently, for finite monoids: aba = ab. | Finite | Pin p. 158 |
| $\mathbf {L_1}$: idempotent and L-trivial monoids | L-trivial. That is, each L-equivalence class is trivial.; Equivalently, for finite monoids: aba = ba. | Finite | Pin p. 158 |
| $\mathbb D\mathbf{S}$: Semigroup whose regular D are semigroup | Equivalently, for finite monoids: $(a^\omega a^\omega a^\omega)^\omega=a^\omega$.; Equivalently, regular H-classes are groups, Equivalently, v≤_{J}a implies v R va and v L av; Equivalently, for each idempotent e, the set of a such that e≤_{J}a is closed under product (i.e. this set is a subsemigroup); Equivalently, there exists no idempotent e and f such that e J f but not ef J e; Equivalently, the monoid $B^1_2$ does not divide $S\times S$ | Finite | Pin pp. 154, 155, 158 |
| $\mathbb D\mathbf{A}$: Semigroup whose regular D are aperiodic semigroup | Each regular D-class is an aperiodic semigroup; Equivalently, every regular D-class is a rectangular band; Equivalently, regular D-class are semigroup, and furthermore S is aperiodic; Equivalently, for finite monoid: regular D-class are semigroup, and furthermore $aa^\omega=a^\omega$; Equivalently, e≤_{J}a implies eae = e; Equivalently, e≤_{J}f implies efe = e. | Finite | Pin p. 156, 158 |
| $\ell\mathbf{1}$/$\mathbf K$: Lefty trivial semigroup | e: eS = e, Equivalently, I is a left zero semigroup equal to E, Equivalently, for finite semigroup: I is a left zero semigroup equals $S^{|S|}$, Equivalently, for finite semigroup: $a_1\dots a_ny=a_1\dots a_n$, Equivalently, for finite semigroup: $a^\omega b=a^\omega$. | Finite | Pin pp. 149, 158 |
| $\mathbf{r1}$/$\mathbf D$: Right trivial semigroup | e: Se = e, Equivalently, I is a right zero semigroup equal to E, Equivalently, for finite semigroup: I is a right zero semigroup equals $S^{|S|}$, Equivalently, for finite semigroup: $b a_1\dots a_n=a_1\dots a_n$, Equivalently, for finite semigroup: $b a^\omega=a^\omega$. | Finite | Pin pp. 149, 158 |
| $\mathbb L\mathbf{1}$: Locally trivial semigroup | eSe = e, Equivalently, I is equal to E, Equivalently, eaf = ef, Equivalently, for finite semigroup: $y a_1\dots a_n=a_1\dots a_n$, Equivalently, for finite semigroup: $a_1\dots a_n y a_1\dots a_n=a_1\dots a_n$, Equivalently, for finite semigroup: $a^\omega b a^\omega=a^\omega$. | Finite | Pin pp. 150, 158 |
| $\mathbb L\mathbf{G}$: Locally groups | eSe is a group, Equivalently, E⊆I, Equivalently, for finite semigroup: $(a^\omega b a^\omega)^\omega=a^\omega$. | Finite | Pin pp. 151, 158 |

List of special classes of ordered semigroups
| Terminology | Defining property | Variety | Reference(s) |
|---|---|---|---|
| Ordered semigroup | A semigroup with a partial order relation ≤, such that a ≤ b implies c•a ≤ c•b and a•c ≤ b•c | Finite | Pin p. 14 |
| $\mathbf{N}^+$ | Nilpotent finite semigroups, with $a\le b^\omega$ | Finite | Pin pp. 157, 158 |
| $\mathbf{N}^-$ | Nilpotent finite semigroups, with $b^\omega\le a$ | Finite | Pin pp. 157, 158 |
| $\mathbf{J}_1^+$ | Semilattices with $1\le a$ | Finite | Pin pp. 157, 158 |
| $\mathbf{J}_1^-$ | Semilattices with $a\le 1$ | Finite | Pin pp. 157, 158 |
| $\mathbb L\mathbf{J}_1^+$ locally positive J-trivial semigroup | Finite semigroups satisfying $a^\omega\le a^\omega ba^\omega$ | Finite | Pin pp. 157, 158 |
