= Automorphism =

Isomorphism of an object to itself

An automorphism of the Klein four-group shown as a mapping between two Cayley graphs, a permutation in cycle notation, and a mapping between two Cayley tables.

In mathematics, an automorphism is an isomorphism from a mathematical object to itself. It is, in some sense, a symmetry of the object, and a way of mapping the object to itself while preserving all of its structure. The set of all automorphisms of an object forms a group, called the automorphism group. It is, loosely speaking, the symmetry group of the object.

== Definition ==
In an algebraic structure such as a group, a ring, or vector space, an automorphism is simply a bijective homomorphism of an object into itself. (The definition of a homomorphism depends on the type of algebraic structure; see, for example, group homomorphism, ring homomorphism, and linear operator.)

More generally, for an object in some category, an automorphism is a morphism of the object to itself that has an inverse morphism; that is, a morphism $f: X\to X$ is an automorphism if there is a morphism $g: X\to X$ such that $g\circ f= f\circ g = \operatorname {id}_X,$ where $\operatorname {id}_X$ is the identity morphism of X. For algebraic structures, the two definitions are equivalent; in this case, the identity morphism is simply the identity function, and is often called the trivial automorphism.

== Automorphism group ==
The automorphisms of an object X form a group under composition of morphisms, which is called the automorphism group of X. This results straightforwardly from the definition of a category.

The automorphism group of an object X in a category C is often denoted Aut_{C}(X), or simply Aut(X) if the category is clear from context.

== Examples ==
- In set theory, an arbitrary permutation of the elements of a set X is an automorphism. The automorphism group of X is also called the symmetric group on X.
- In elementary arithmetic, the set of integers, $\Z$, considered as a group under addition, has a unique nontrivial automorphism: negation. Considered as a ring, however, it has only the trivial automorphism. Generally speaking, negation is an automorphism of any abelian group, but not of a ring or field.
- A group automorphism is a group isomorphism from a group to itself. Informally, it is a permutation of the group elements such that the structure remains unchanged. For every group G there is a natural group homomorphism G → Aut(G) whose image is the group Inn(G) of inner automorphisms and whose kernel is the center of G. Thus, if G has trivial center it can be embedded into its own automorphism group.
- In linear algebra, an endomorphism of a vector space V is a linear operator V → V. An automorphism is an invertible linear operator on V. When the vector space is finite-dimensional, the automorphism group of V is the same as the general linear group, GL(V). (The algebraic structure of all endomorphisms of V is itself an algebra over the same base field as V, whose invertible elements precisely consist of GL(V).)
- A field automorphism is a bijective ring homomorphism from a field to itself.
  - The field $\Q$ of the rational numbers has no other automorphism than the identity, since an automorphism must fix the additive identity 0 and the multiplicative identity 1; the sum of a finite number of 1 must be fixed, as well as the additive inverses of these sums (that is, the automorphism fixes all integers); finally, since every rational number is the quotient of two integers, all rational numbers must be fixed by any automorphism.
  - The field $\R$ of the real numbers has no automorphisms other than the identity. Indeed, the rational numbers must be fixed by every automorphism, per above; an automorphism must preserve inequalities since $x<y$ is equivalent to $\exists z\mid y-x=z^2,$ and the latter property is preserved by every automorphism; finally every real number must be fixed since it is the least upper bound of a sequence of rational numbers.
  - The field $\Complex$ of the complex numbers has a unique nontrivial automorphism that fixes the real numbers. It is the complex conjugation, which maps $i$ to $-i.$ The axiom of choice implies the existence of uncountably many automorphisms that do not fix the real numbers.
  - The study of automorphisms of algebraic field extensions is the starting point and the main object of Galois theory.
- The automorphism group of the quaternions ($\mathbb H$) as a ring are the inner automorphisms, by the Skolem–Noether theorem: maps of the form a ↦ bab^{−1}. This group is isomorphic to SO(3), the group of rotations in 3-dimensional space.
- The automorphism group of the octonions ($\mathbb O$) is the exceptional Lie group G_{2}.
- In graph theory an automorphism of a graph is a permutation of the nodes that preserves edges and non-edges. In particular, if two nodes are joined by an edge, so are their images under the permutation.
- In geometry, an automorphism may be called a motion of the space. Specialized terminology is also used:
  - In metric geometry an automorphism is a self-isometry. The automorphism group is also called the isometry group.
  - In the category of Riemann surfaces, an automorphism is a biholomorphic map (also called a conformal map), from a surface to itself. For example, the automorphisms of the Riemann sphere are Möbius transformations.
  - An automorphism of a differentiable manifold M is a diffeomorphism from M to itself. The automorphism group is sometimes denoted Diff(M).
  - In topology, morphisms between topological spaces are called continuous maps, and an automorphism of a topological space is a homeomorphism of the space to itself, or self-homeomorphism (see homeomorphism group). In this example it is not sufficient for a morphism to be bijective to be an isomorphism.

== History ==
One of the earliest group automorphisms (automorphism of a group, not simply a group of automorphisms of points) was given by the Irish mathematician William Rowan Hamilton in 1856, in his icosian calculus, where he discovered an order two automorphism, writing:

so that $\mu$ is a new fifth root of unity, connected with the former fifth root $\lambda$ by relations of perfect reciprocity.

== Inner and outer automorphisms ==
In some categories—notably groups, rings, and Lie algebras—it is possible to separate automorphisms into two types, called "inner" and "outer" automorphisms.

In the case of groups, the inner automorphisms are the conjugations by the elements of the group itself. For each element a of a group G, conjugation by a is the operation φ_{a} : G → G given by φ_{a}(g) = aga^{−1} (or a^{−1}ga; usage varies). One can easily check that conjugation by a is a group automorphism. The inner automorphisms form a normal subgroup of Aut(G), denoted by Inn(G); this is called Goursat's lemma.

The other automorphisms are called outer automorphisms. The quotient group Aut(G) / Inn(G) is usually denoted by Out(G); the non-trivial elements are the cosets that contain the outer automorphisms.

The same definition holds in any unital ring or algebra where a is any invertible element. For Lie algebras the definition is slightly different.

== See also ==
- Antiautomorphism
- Automorphism (in Sudoku puzzles)
- Characteristic subgroup
- Endomorphism ring
- Frobenius automorphism
- Morphism
- Order automorphism (in order theory).
- Relation-preserving automorphism
- Fractional Fourier transform
