= Inverse element =

Generalization of additive and multiplicative inverses

In mathematics, the concept of an inverse element generalises the concepts of opposite (−x) and reciprocal (1/x) of numbers.

Given an operation denoted here ∗, and an identity element denoted e, if x ∗ y = e, one says that x is a left inverse of y, and that y is a right inverse of x. (An identity element is an element such that x ∗ e = x and e ∗ y = y for all x and y for which the left-hand sides are defined.)

When the operation ∗ is associative, if an element x has both a left inverse and a right inverse, then these two inverses are equal and unique; they are called the inverse element or simply the inverse. Often an adjective is added for specifying the operation, such as in additive inverse, multiplicative inverse, and functional inverse. In this case (associative operation), an invertible element is an element that has an inverse. In a ring, an invertible element, also called a unit, is an element that is invertible under multiplication (this is not ambiguous, as every element is invertible under addition).

Inverses are commonly used in groups—where every element is invertible, and rings—where invertible elements are also called units. They are also commonly used for operations that are not defined for all possible operands, such as inverse matrices and inverse functions. This has been generalized to category theory, where, by definition, an isomorphism is an invertible morphism.

The word 'inverse' is derived from Latin: inversus that means 'turned upside down', 'overturned'. This may take its origin from the case of fractions, where the (multiplicative) inverse is obtained by exchanging the numerator and the denominator (the inverse of $\tfrac x y$ is $\tfrac y x$).

== Definitions and basic properties ==
The concepts of inverse element and invertible element are commonly defined for binary operations that are everywhere defined (that is, the operation is defined for any two elements of its domain). However, these concepts are also commonly used with partial operations, that is operations that are not defined everywhere. Common examples are matrix multiplication, function composition and composition of morphisms in a category. It follows that the common definitions of associativity and identity element must be extended to partial operations; this is the object of the first subsections.

In this section, X is a set (possibly a proper class) on which a partial operation (possibly total) is defined, which is denoted with $*.$

=== Associativity ===
A partial operation is associative if
$$x*(y*z)=(x*y)*z$$
for every x, y, z in X for which one of the members of the equality is defined; the equality means that the other member of the equality must also be defined.

Examples of non-total associative operations are multiplication of matrices of arbitrary size, and function composition.

=== Identity elements ===
Let $*$ be a possibly partial associative operation on a set X.

An identity element, or simply an identity is an element e such that
$$x*e=x \quad\text{and}\quad e*y=y$$
for every x and y for which the left-hand sides of the equalities are defined.

If e and f are two identity elements such that $e*f$ is defined, then $e=f.$ (This results immediately from the definition, by $e=e*f=f.$)

It follows that a total operation has at most one identity element, and if e and f are different identities, then $e*f$ is not defined.

For example, in the case of matrix multiplication, there is one n×n identity matrix for every positive integer n, and two identity matrices of different size cannot be multiplied together.

Similarly, identity functions are identity elements for function composition, and the composition of the identity functions of two different sets are not defined.

=== Left and right inverses ===
If $x*y=e,$ where e is an identity element, one says that x is a left inverse of y, and y is a right inverse of x.

Left and right inverses do not always exist, even when the operation is total and associative. For example, addition is a total associative operation on nonnegative integers, which has 0 as additive identity, and 0 is the only element that has an additive inverse. This lack of inverses is the main motivation for extending the natural numbers into the integers.

An element can have several left inverses and several right inverses, even when the operation is total and associative. For example, consider the functions from the integers to the integers. The doubling function $x\mapsto 2x$ has infinitely many left inverses under function composition, which are the functions that divide by two the even numbers, and give any value to odd numbers. Similarly, every function that maps n to either $2n$ or $2n+1$ is a right inverse of the function $n\mapsto \left\lfloor \frac n2\right\rfloor,$ the floor function that maps n to $\frac n2$ or $\frac{n-1}2,$ depending whether n is even or odd.

More generally, a function has a left inverse for function composition if and only if it is injective, and it has a right inverse if and only if it is surjective.

In category theory, right inverses are also called sections, and left inverses are called retractions.

=== Inverses ===
An element is invertible under an operation if it has a left inverse and a right inverse.

In the common case where the operation is associative, the left and right inverse of an element are equal and unique. Indeed, if l and r are respectively a left inverse and a right inverse of x, then
$$l=l*(x*r)=(l*x)*r=r.$$

The inverse of an invertible element is its unique left or right inverse.

If the operation is denoted as an addition, the inverse, or additive inverse, of an element x is denoted $-x.$ Otherwise, the inverse of x is generally denoted $x^{-1},$ or, in the case of a commutative multiplication $\frac 1x.$ When there may be a confusion between several operations, the symbol of the operation may be added before the exponent, such as in $x^{* -1}.$ The notation $f^{\circ -1}$ is not commonly used for function composition, since $\frac 1f$ can be used for the multiplicative inverse.

If x and y are invertible, and $x*y$ is defined, then $x*y$ is invertible, and its inverse is $y^{-1}x^{-1}.$

An invertible homomorphism is called an isomorphism. In category theory, an invertible morphism is also called an isomorphism.

== In groups ==
A group is a set with an associative operation that has an identity element, and for which every element has an inverse.

Thus, the inverse is a function from the group to itself that may also be considered as an operation of arity one. It is also an involution, since the inverse of the inverse of an element is the element itself.

A group may act on a set as transformations of this set. In this case, the inverse $g^{-1}$ of a group element $g$ defines a transformation that is the inverse of the transformation defined by $g,$ that is, the transformation that "undoes" the transformation defined by $g.$

For example, the Rubik's Cube group represents the finite sequences of elementary moves. The inverse of such a sequence is obtained by applying the inverse of each move in the reverse order.

== In monoids ==
A monoid is a set with an associative operation that has an identity element.

The invertible elements in a monoid form a group under monoid operation.

A ring is a monoid for ring multiplication. In this case, the invertible elements are also called units and form the group of units of the ring.

If a monoid is not commutative, there may exist non-invertible elements that have a left inverse or a right inverse (not both, as, otherwise, the element would be invertible).

For example, the set of the functions from a set to itself is a monoid under function composition. In this monoid, the invertible elements are the bijective functions; the elements that have left inverses are the injective functions, and those that have right inverses are the surjective functions.

Given a monoid, one may want extend it by adding inverse to some elements. This is generally impossible for non-commutative monoids, but, in a commutative monoid, it is possible to add inverses to the elements that have the cancellation property (an element x has the cancellation property if $xy=xz$ implies $y=z,$ and $yx=zx$ implies $y=z$). This extension of a monoid is allowed by Grothendieck group construction. This is the method that is commonly used for constructing integers from natural numbers, rational numbers from integers and, more generally, the field of fractions of an integral domain, and localizations of commutative rings.

== In rings ==
A ring is an algebraic structure with two operations, addition and multiplication, which are denoted as the usual operations on numbers.

Under addition, a ring is an abelian group, which means that addition is commutative and associative; it has an identity, called the additive identity, and denoted 0; and every element x has an inverse, called its additive inverse and denoted −x. Because of commutativity, the concepts of left and right inverses are meaningless since they do not differ from inverses.

Under multiplication, a ring is a monoid; this means that multiplication is associative and has an identity called the multiplicative identity and denoted 1. An invertible element for multiplication is called a unit. The inverse or multiplicative inverse (for avoiding confusion with additive inverses) of a unit x is denoted $x^{-1},$ or, when the multiplication is commutative, $\frac 1x.$

The additive identity 0 is never a unit, except when the ring is the zero ring, which has 0 as its unique element.

If 0 is the only non-unit, the ring is a field if the multiplication is commutative, or a division ring otherwise.

In a noncommutative ring (that is, a ring whose multiplication is not commutative), a non-invertible element may have one or several left or right inverses. This is, for example, the case of the linear functions from an infinite-dimensional vector space to itself.

A commutative ring (that is, a ring whose multiplication is commutative) may be extended by adding inverses to elements that are not zero divisors (that is, their product with a nonzero element cannot be 0). This is the process of localization, which produces, in particular, the field of rational numbers from the ring of integers, and, more generally, the field of fractions of an integral domain. Localization is also used with zero divisors, but, in this case the original ring is not a subring of the localisation; instead, it is mapped non-injectively to the localization.

== Matrices ==
Matrix multiplication is commonly defined for matrices over a field, and straightforwardly extended to matrices over rings, rngs and semirings. However, in this section, only matrices over a commutative ring are considered, because of the use of the concept of rank and determinant.

If A is a m×n matrix (that is, a matrix with m rows and n columns), and B is a p×q matrix, the product AB is defined if n = p, and only in this case. An identity matrix, that is, an identity element for matrix multiplication is a square matrix (same number for rows and columns) whose entries of the main diagonal are all equal to 1, and all other entries are 0.

An invertible matrix is an invertible element under matrix multiplication. A matrix over a commutative ring R is invertible if and only if its determinant is a unit in R (that is, is invertible in R. In this case, its inverse matrix can be computed with Cramer's rule.

If R is a field, the determinant is invertible if and only if it is not zero. As the case of fields is more common, one see often invertible matrices defined as matrices with a nonzero determinant, but this is incorrect over rings.

In the case of integer matrices (that is, matrices with integer entries), an invertible matrix is a matrix that has an inverse that is also an integer matrix. Such a matrix is called a unimodular matrix for distinguishing it from matrices that are invertible over the real numbers. A square integer matrix is unimodular if and only if its determinant is 1 or −1, since these two numbers are the only units in the ring of integers.

A matrix has a left inverse if and only if its rank equals its number of columns. This left inverse is not unique except for square matrices where the left inverse equal the inverse matrix. Similarly, a right inverse exists if and only if the rank equals the number of rows; it is not unique in the case of a rectangular matrix, and equals the inverse matrix in the case of a square matrix.

== Functions, homomorphisms and morphisms ==
Composition is a partial operation that generalizes to homomorphisms of algebraic structures and morphisms of categories into operations that are also called composition, and share many properties with function composition.

In all the case, composition is associative.

If $f\colon X\to Y$ and $g\colon Y'\to Z,$ the composition $g\circ f$ is defined if and only if $Y'=Y$ or, in the function and homomorphism cases, $Y\subset Y'.$ In the function and homomorphism cases, this means that the codomain of $f$ equals or is included in the domain of g. In the morphism case, this means that the codomain of $f$ equals the domain of g.

There is an identity $\operatorname{id}_X \colon X \to X$ for every object X (set, algebraic structure or object), which is called also an identity function in the function case.

A function is invertible if and only if it is a bijection. An invertible homomorphism or morphism is called an isomorphism. An homomorphism of algebraic structures is an isomorphism if and only if it is a bijection. The inverse of a bijection is called an inverse function. In the other cases, one talks of inverse isomorphisms.

A function has a left inverse or a right inverse if and only it is injective or surjective, respectively. An homomorphism of algebraic structures that has a left inverse or a right inverse is respectively injective or surjective, but the converse is not true in some algebraic structures. For example, the converse is true for vector spaces but not for modules over a ring: a homomorphism of modules that has a left inverse of a right inverse is called respectively a split epimorphism or a split monomorphism. This terminology is also used for morphisms in any category.

== Generalizations ==
=== In a unital magma ===
Let $S$ be a unital magma, that is, a set with a binary operation $*$ and an identity element $e\in S$. If, for $a,b\in S$, we have $a*b=e$, then $a$ is called a left inverse of $b$ and $b$ is called a right inverse of $a$. If an element $x$ is both a left inverse and a right inverse of $y$, then $x$ is called a two-sided inverse, or simply an inverse, of $y$. An element with a two-sided inverse in $S$ is called invertible in $S$. An element with an inverse element only on one side is left invertible or right invertible.

Elements of a unital magma $(S,*)$ may have multiple left, right or two-sided inverses. For example, in the magma given by the Cayley table

*	1	2	3
1	1	2	3
2	2	1	1
3	3	1	1

the elements 2 and 3 each have two two-sided inverses.

A unital magma in which all elements are invertible need not be a loop. For example, in the magma $(S,*)$ given by the Cayley table

*	1	2	3
1	1	2	3
2	2	1	2
3	3	2	1

every element has a unique two-sided inverse (namely itself), but $(S,*)$ is not a loop because the Cayley table is not a Latin square.

Similarly, a loop need not have two-sided inverses. For example, in the loop given by the Cayley table

*	1	2	3	4	5
1	1	2	3	4	5
2	2	3	1	5	4
3	3	4	5	1	2
4	4	5	2	3	1
5	5	1	4	2	3

the only element with a two-sided inverse is the identity element 1.

If the operation $*$ is associative then if an element has both a left inverse and a right inverse, they are equal. In other words, in a monoid (an associative unital magma) every element has at most one inverse (as defined in this section). In a monoid, the set of invertible elements is a group, called the group of units of $S$, and denoted by $U(S)$ or H_{1}.

=== In a semigroup ===
The definition in the previous section generalizes the notion of inverse in group relative to the notion of identity. It's also possible, albeit less obvious, to generalize the notion of an inverse by dropping the identity element but keeping associativity; that is, in a semigroup.

In a semigroup S an element x is called (von Neumann) regular if there exists some element z in S such that xzx = x; z is sometimes called a pseudoinverse. An element y is called (simply) an inverse of x if xyx = x and y = yxy. Every regular element has at least one inverse: if x = xzx then it is easy to verify that y = zxz is an inverse of x as defined in this section. Another easy to prove fact: if y is an inverse of x then e = xy and f = yx are idempotents, that is ee = e and ff = f. Thus, every pair of (mutually) inverse elements gives rise to two idempotents, and ex = xf = x, ye = fy = y, and e acts as a left identity on x, while f acts a right identity, and the left/right roles are reversed for y. This simple observation can be generalized using Green's relations: every idempotent e in an arbitrary semigroup is a left identity for R_{e} and right identity for L_{e}. An intuitive description of this fact is that every pair of mutually inverse elements produces a local left identity, and respectively, a local right identity.

In a monoid, the notion of inverse as defined in the previous section is strictly narrower than the definition given in this section. Only elements in the Green class H_{1} have an inverse from the unital magma perspective, whereas for any idempotent e, the elements of H_{e} have an inverse as defined in this section. Under this more general definition, inverses need not be unique (or exist) in an arbitrary semigroup or monoid. If all elements are regular, then the semigroup (or monoid) is called regular, and every element has at least one inverse. If every element has exactly one inverse as defined in this section, then the semigroup is called an inverse semigroup. Finally, an inverse semigroup with only one idempotent is a group. An inverse semigroup may have an absorbing element 0 because 000 = 0, whereas a group may not.

Outside semigroup theory, a unique inverse as defined in this section is sometimes called a quasi-inverse. This is generally justified because in most applications (for example, all examples in this article) associativity holds, which makes this notion a generalization of the left/right inverse relative to an identity (see Generalized inverse).

=== U-semigroups ===
A natural generalization of the inverse semigroup is to define an (arbitrary) unary operation ° such that (a°)° = a for all a in S; this endows S with a type ⟨2,1⟩ algebra. A semigroup endowed with such an operation is called a U-semigroup. Although it may seem that a° will be the inverse of a, this is not necessarily the case. In order to obtain interesting notion(s), the unary operation must somehow interact with the semigroup operation. Two classes of U-semigroups have been studied:

- I-semigroups, in which the interaction axiom is aa°a = a
- *-semigroups, in which the interaction axiom is (ab)° = b°a°. Such an operation is typically denoted by a*

Clearly a group is both an I-semigroup and a *-semigroup. A class of semigroups important in semigroup theory are completely regular semigroups; these are I-semigroups in which one additionally has aa° = a°a; in other words every element has commuting pseudoinverse a°. There are few concrete examples of such semigroups however; most are completely simple semigroups. In contrast, a subclass of *-semigroups, the *-regular semigroups (in the sense of Drazin), yield one of best known examples of a (unique) pseudoinverse, the Moore–Penrose inverse. In this case however the involution a* is not the pseudoinverse. Rather, the pseudoinverse of x is the unique element y such that xyx = x, yxy = y, (xy)* = xy, (yx)* = yx. Since *-regular semigroups generalize inverse semigroups, the unique element defined this way in a *-regular semigroup is called the generalized inverse or Moore–Penrose inverse.

=== Examples ===
All examples in this section involve associative operators.

==== Galois connections ====
The lower and upper adjoints in a (monotone) Galois connection, L and G are quasi-inverses of each other; that is, LGL = L and GLG = G and one uniquely determines the other. They are not left or right inverses of each other however.

==== Generalized inverses of matrices ====
A square matrix $M$ with entries in a field $K$ is invertible (in the set of all square matrices of the same size, under matrix multiplication) if and only if its determinant is different from zero. If the determinant of $M$ is zero, it is impossible for it to have a one-sided inverse; therefore a left inverse or right inverse implies the existence of the other one. See invertible matrix for more.

More generally, a square matrix over a commutative ring $R$ is invertible if and only if its determinant is invertible in $R$.

Non-square matrices of full rank have several one-sided inverses:

- For $A:m\times n \mid m>n$ we have left inverses; for example, $\underbrace{ \left(A^\text{T}A\right)^{-1} A^\text{T} }_{ A^{-1}_\text{left} } A = I_n$
- For $A:m\times n \mid m<n$ we have right inverses; for example, $A \underbrace{ A^\text{T}\left(AA^\text{T}\right)^{-1} }_{ A^{-1}_\text{right} } = I_m$

The left inverse can be used to determine the least norm solution of $Ax = b$, which is also the least squares formula for regression and is given by $x = \left(A^\text{T}A\right)^{-1}A^\text{T}b.$

No rank deficient matrix has any (even one-sided) inverse. However, the Moore–Penrose inverse exists for all matrices, and coincides with the left or right (or true) inverse when it exists.

As an example of matrix inverses, consider:

$$A:2 \times 3 =
\begin{bmatrix}
1 & 2 & 3 \\
4 & 5 & 6
\end{bmatrix}$$

So, as m < n, we have a right inverse, $A^{-1}_\text{right} = A^\text{T} \left(AA^\text{T}\right)^{-1}.$ By components it is computed as

$$\begin{align}
AA^\text{T} &= \begin{bmatrix}
1 & 2 & 3 \\
4 & 5 & 6
\end{bmatrix}
\begin{bmatrix}
1 & 4\\
2 & 5\\
3 & 6
\end{bmatrix} =
\begin{bmatrix}
14 & 32\\
32 & 77
\end{bmatrix} \\[3pt]
\left(AA^\text{T}\right)^{-1} &= \begin{bmatrix}
14 & 32\\
32 & 77
\end{bmatrix}^{-1} = \frac{1}{54}
\begin{bmatrix}
77 & -32\\
-32 & 14
\end{bmatrix} \\[3pt]
A^\text{T}\left(AA^\text{T}\right)^{-1} &= \frac{1}{54}
\begin{bmatrix}
1 & 4\\
2 & 5\\
3 & 6
\end{bmatrix}
\begin{bmatrix}
77 & -32\\
-32 & 14
\end{bmatrix} = \frac{1}{18}
\begin{bmatrix}
-17 & 8\\
-2 & 2\\
13 & -4
\end{bmatrix} = A^{-1}_\text{right}
\end{align}$$

The left inverse doesn't exist, because

$$A^\text{T}A = \begin{bmatrix}
1 & 4\\
2 & 5\\
3 & 6
\end{bmatrix}
\begin{bmatrix}
1 & 2 & 3 \\
4 & 5 & 6
\end{bmatrix} =
\begin{bmatrix}
17 & 22 & 27 \\
22 & 29 & 36\\
27 & 36 & 45
\end{bmatrix}$$

which is a singular matrix, and cannot be inverted.

== See also ==
- Division ring
- Latin square property
- Loop (algebra)
- Unit (ring theory)
- Modular multiplicative inverse
