= Aperiodic semigroup =

Type of semigroup

In mathematics, an aperiodic semigroup is a semigroup S such that every element is aperiodic, that is, for each x in S there exists a positive integer n such that x^{n} = x^{n+1}. An aperiodic monoid is an aperiodic semigroup which is a monoid.

== Finite aperiodic semigroups ==
A finite semigroup is aperiodic if and only if it contains no nontrivial subgroups, so a synonym used (only?) in such contexts is group-free semigroup. In terms of Green's relations, a finite semigroup is aperiodic if and only if its H-relation is trivial. These two characterizations extend to group-bound semigroups.

A celebrated result of algebraic automata theory due to Marcel-Paul Schützenberger asserts that a language is star-free if and only if its syntactic monoid is finite and aperiodic.

A consequence of the Krohn–Rhodes theorem is that every finite aperiodic monoid divides a wreath product of copies of the three-element flip-flop monoid, consisting of an identity element and two right zeros. The two-sided Krohn–Rhodes theorem alternatively characterizes finite aperiodic monoids as divisors of iterated block products of copies of the two-element semilattice.

== See also ==
- Monogenic semigroup
- Special classes of semigroups
