= Right group =

In mathematics, a right group is an algebraic structure consisting of a set together with a binary operation that combines two elements into a third element while obeying the right group axioms. The right group axioms are similar to the group axioms, but while groups can have only one identity and any element can have only one inverse, right groups allow for multiple one-sided identity elements and multiple one-sided inverse elements.

It can be proven (theorem 1.27 in) that a right group is isomorphic to the direct product of a right zero semigroup and a group, while a right abelian group is the direct product of a right zero semigroup and an abelian group. Left group and left abelian group are defined in analogous way, by substituting right for left in the definitions. The rest of this article will be mostly concerned about right groups, but everything applies to left groups by doing the appropriate right/left substitutions.

== Definition ==
A right group, originally called multiple group, is a set $R$ with a binary operation ⋅, satisfying the following axioms:

Closure
For all $a$ and $b$ in $R$, there is an element c in $R$ such that $c = a \cdot b$.
Associativity
For all $a, b, c$ in $R$, $(a \cdot b) \cdot c = a \cdot (b \cdot c)$.
Left identity element
There is at least one left identity in $R$. That is, there exists an element $e$ such that $e \cdot a = a$ for all $a$ in $R$. Such an element does not need to be unique.
Right inverse elements
For every $a$ in $R$ and every identity element $e$, also in $R$, there is at least one element $b$ in $R$, such that $a \cdot b = e$. Such element $b$ is said to be the right inverse of $a$ with respect to $e$.

== Examples ==
=== Direct product of finite sets ===
Clifford provides the following example. Take the group $G = \{ e, a, b \}$, the right zero semigroup $Z = \{ 1, 2 \}$ and construct a right group $R_{gz}$ as the direct product of $G$ and $Z$.

$G$ is simply the cyclic group of order 3, with $e$ as its identity, and $a$ and $b$ as the inverses of each other.

$G$ table
	e	a	b
e	e	a	b
a	a	b	e
b	b	e	a

$Z$ is the right zero semigroup of order 2. Notice the each element repeats along its column, since by definition $x \cdot y = y$, for any $x$ and $y$ in $Z$.

$Z$ table
	1	2
1	1	2
2	1	2

The direct product $R_{gz} = G \times Z$ of these two structures is defined as follows:

- The elements of $R_{gz}$ are ordered pairs $(g, z)$ such that $g$ is in $G$ and $z$ is in $Z$.
- The $R_{gz}$ operation is defined element-wise:
  Formula 1: $(x, y) \cdot (u, v) = (xu, v)$

The elements of $R_{gz}$ will look like $(e, 1), (e, 2), (a, 1)$ and so on. For brevity, let's rename these as $e_1, e_2, a_1$, and so on. The Cayley table of $R_{gz}$ is as follows:

$R_{gz}$ table
	e_{1}	a_{1}	b_{1}	e_{2}	a_{2}	b_{2}
e_{1}	e_{1}	a_{1}	b_{1}	e_{2}	a_{2}	b_{2}
a_{1}	a_{1}	b_{1}	e_{1}	a_{2}	b_{2}	e_{2}
b_{1}	b_{1}	e_{1}	a_{1}	b_{2}	e_{2}	a_{2}
e_{2}	e_{1}	a_{1}	b_{1}	e_{2}	a_{2}	b_{2}
a_{2}	a_{1}	b_{1}	e_{1}	a_{2}	b_{2}	e_{2}
b_{2}	b_{1}	e_{1}	a_{1}	b_{2}	e_{2}	a_{2}

Here are some facts about $R_{gz}$:

- $R_{gz}$ has two left identities: $e_1$ and $e_2$. Some examples:
  $$e2 \cdot b1 = b1$$
  $$e1 \cdot a2 = a2$$
- Each element has two right inverses. For example, the right inverses of $a_2$ with regards to $e_1$ and $e_2$ are $b_1$ and $b_2$, respectively.
  $$a2 \cdot b1 = e1$$
  $$a2 \cdot b2 = e2$$

=== Complex numbers in polar coordinates ===
Clifford gives a second example involving complex numbers. Given two non-zero complex numbers a and b, the following operation forms a right group:
$$a \cdot b = |a|\, b$$
All complex numbers with modulus equal to 1 are left identities, and all complex numbers will have a right inverse with respect to any left identity.

The inner structure of this right group becomes clear when we use polar coordinates: let $a = A e^{i \alpha}$ and $b = B e^{i \beta}$, where A and B are the magnitudes and $\alpha$ and $\beta$ are the arguments (angles) of a and b, respectively. $a \cdot b$ (this is not the regular multiplication of complex numbers) then becomes $A e^{i \alpha} \cdot B e^{i \beta} = AB e^{i \beta}$. If we represent the magnitudes and arguments as ordered pairs, we can write this as:

Formula 2: $(A, \alpha) \cdot (B,\beta) = (AB, \beta)$

This right group is the direct product of a group (positive real numbers under multiplication) and a right zero semigroup induced by the real numbers. Structurally, this is identical to formula 1 above. In fact, this is how all right group operations look like when written as ordered pairs of the direct product of their factors.

=== Complex numbers in cartesian coordinates ===
If we take the and complex numbers and define an operation similar to example 2 but use cartesian instead of polar coordinates and addition instead of multiplication, we get another right group, with operation defined as follows:

$(a + bi) \cdot (c + di) = a + c + di$, or equivalently:
Formula 3: $(a,b) \cdot (c,d) = (a+c,d)$

=== A practical example from computer science ===
Consider the following example from computer science, where a set would be implemented as a programming language type.

- Let $X$ be the set of date times in an arbitrary programming language.
- Let $D$ be the set of transformations equivalent to adding a duration to an element of $X$.
- Let $Z$ be the set of time zone transformations on elements of $X$.

Both $D$ and $Z$ are subsets of $T_x$, the full transformation semigroup on $X$. $D$ behaves like a group, where there is a zero duration and every duration has an inverse duration. If we treat these transformations as right semigroup actions, $Z$ behaves like a right zero semigroup, such that a time zone transformation always cancels any previous time zone transformation on a given date time.

Given any two arbitrary date times $a$ and $b$ (ignore issues regarding representation boundaries), one can find a pair of a duration and a time zone that will transform $a$ into $b$. This composite transformation of time zone conversion and duration adding is isomorphic to the right group $D \times Z$.

Taking the java.time package as an example, the sets $X, D$ and $Z$ would correspond to the class ZonedDateTime, the function plus and the function withZoneSameInstant, respectively. More concretely, for any ZonedDateTime t1 and t2, there is a Duration d and a ZoneId z, such that:

t2 = t1.plus(d).withZoneSomeInstant(z)

The expression above can be written more concisely using right action notation borrowed from group theory as:
$$t2 = t1.d.z$$
It can also be verified that durations and time zones, when viewed as transformations on date/times, in addition to obeying the axioms of groups and right zero semigroups, respectively, they commute with each other. That is, for any date/time t, any duration d and any timezone z:
$$t.d.z = t.z.d$$
This is the same as saying:
$$d \cdot z = z \cdot d$$
