= Epigroup =

Type of semigroup

In abstract algebra, an epigroup is a semigroup in which every element has a power that belongs to a subgroup. Formally, for all x in a semigroup S, there exists a positive integer n and a subgroup G of S such that x^{n} belongs to G.

Epigroups are known by wide variety of other names, including quasi-periodic semigroup, group-bound semigroup, completely π-regular semigroup, strongly π-regular semigroup (sπr), or just π-regular semigroup (although the latter is ambiguous).

More generally, in an arbitrary semigroup an element is called group-bound if it has a power that belongs to a subgroup.

Epigroups have applications to ring theory. Many of their properties are studied in this context.

Epigroups were first studied by Douglas Munn in 1961, who called them pseudoinvertible.

== Properties ==
- Epigroups are a generalization of periodic semigroups, thus all finite semigroups are also epigroups.
- The class of epigroups also contains all completely regular semigroups and all completely 0-simple semigroups.
- All epigroups are also eventually regular semigroups. (also known as π-regular semigroups)
- A cancellative epigroup is a group.
- Green's relations D and J coincide for any epigroup.
- If S is an epigroup, any regular subsemigroup of S is also an epigroup.
- In an epigroup the Nambooripad order (as extended by P.R. Jones) and the natural partial order (of Mitsch) coincide.

== Examples ==
- The semigroup of all square matrices of a given size over a division ring is an epigroup.
- The multiplicative semigroup of every semisimple Artinian ring is an epigroup.
- Any algebraic semigroup is an epigroup.

== Structure ==
By analogy with periodic semigroups, an epigroup S is partitioned in classes given by its idempotents, which act as identities for each subgroup. For each idempotent e of S, the set: $K_e = \{ x \in S \mid \exists n>0 : x^n \in G_e \}$ is called a unipotency class (whereas for periodic semigroups the usual name is torsion class.)

Subsemigroups of an epigroup need not be epigroups, but if they are, then they are called subepigroups. If an epigroup S has a partition in unipotent subepigroups (i.e. each containing a single idempotent), then this partition is unique, and its components are precisely the unipotency classes defined above; such an epigroup is called unipotently partitionable. However, not every epigroup has this property. A simple counterexample is the Brandt semigroup with five elements B_{2} because the unipotency class of its zero element is not a subsemigroup. B_{2} is actually the quintessential epigroup that is not unipotently partitionable. An epigroup is unipotently partitionable if and only if it contains no subsemigroup that is an ideal extension of a unipotent epigroup by B_{2}.

== See also ==
Special classes of semigroups
