= Monogenic semigroup =

Semigroup generated by a single element

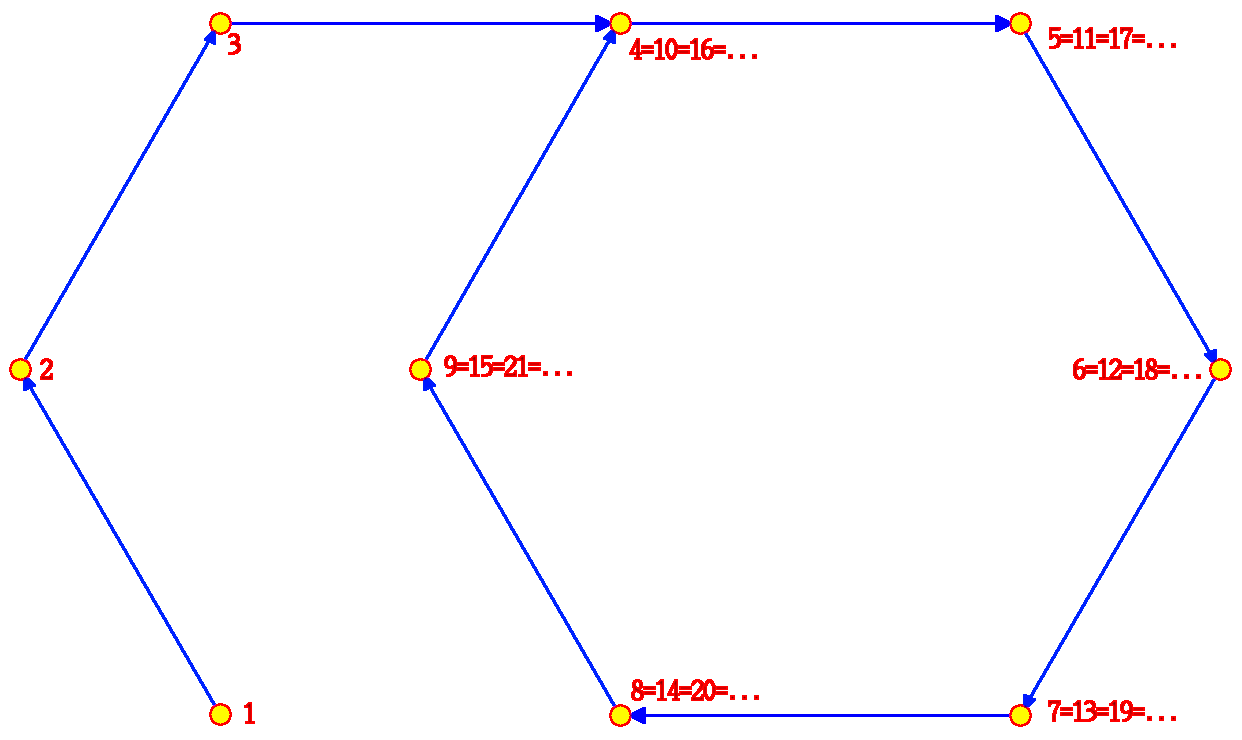
Monogenic semigroup of order 9 and period 6. Numbers are exponents of the generator a; arrows indicate multiplication by a.

In mathematics, a monogenic semigroup is a semigroup generated by a single element. Monogenic semigroups are also called cyclic semigroups.

== Structure ==
The monogenic semigroup generated by the singleton set {a} is denoted by $\langle a \rangle$. The set of elements of $\langle a \rangle$ is {a, a^{2}, a^{3}, ...}. There are two possibilities for the monogenic semigroup $\langle a \rangle$:

- a^{m} = a^{n} ⇒ m = n.
- There exist m ≠ n such that a^{m} = a^{n}.

In the former case $\langle a \rangle$ is isomorphic to the semigroup ({1, 2, ...}, +) of natural numbers under addition. In such a case, $\langle a \rangle$ is an infinite monogenic semigroup and the element a is said to have infinite order. It is sometimes called the free monogenic semigroup because it is also a free semigroup with one generator.

In the latter case let m be the smallest positive integer such that a^{m} = a^{x} for some positive integer x ≠ m, and let r be smallest positive integer such that a^{m} = a^{m+r}. The positive integer m is referred to as the index and the positive integer r as the period of the monogenic semigroup $\langle a \rangle$. The order of a is defined as m+r−1. The period and the index satisfy the following properties:

- a^{m} = a^{m+r}
- a^{m+x} = a^{m+y} if and only if m + x ≡ m + y (mod r)
- $\langle a \rangle$ = {a, a^{2}, ... , a^{m+r−1}}
- K_{a} = {a^{m}, a^{m+1}, ... , a^{m+r−1}} is a cyclic subgroup and also an ideal of $\langle a \rangle$. It is called the kernel of a and it is the minimal ideal of the monogenic semigroup $\langle a \rangle$.

The pair (m, r) of positive integers determine the structure of monogenic semigroups. For every pair (m, r) of positive integers, there exists a monogenic semigroup having index m and period r. The monogenic semigroup having index m and period r is denoted by M(m, r). The monogenic semigroup M(1, r) is the cyclic group of order r.

The results in this section actually hold for any element a of an arbitrary semigroup and the monogenic subsemigroup $\langle a \rangle$ it generates.

== Related notions ==
A related notion is that of periodic semigroup (also called torsion semigroup), in which every element has finite order (or, equivalently, in which every monogenic subsemigroup is finite). A more general class is that of quasi-periodic semigroups (aka group-bound semigroups or epigroups) in which every element of the semigroup has a power that lies in a subgroup.

An aperiodic semigroup is one in which every monogenic subsemigroup has a period of 1.

== See also ==
- Cycle detection, the problem of finding the parameters of a finite monogenic semigroup using a bounded amount of storage space
- Special classes of semigroups
