= Brandt matrix =

In mathematics, Brandt matrices are matrices, introduced by Brandt (1943), that are related to the number of ideals of given norm in an ideal class of a definite quaternion algebra over the rationals, and that give a representation of the Hecke algebra.

Eichler (1955) calculated the traces of the Brandt matrices.

Let O be an order in a quaternion algebra with class number H, and I_{i},...,I_{H} invertible left O-ideals representing the classes. Fix an integer m. Let e_{j} denote the number of units in the right order of I_{j} and let B_{ij} denote the number of α in I_{j}^{−1}I_{i} with reduced norm N(α) equal to mN(I_{i})/N(I_{j}). The Brandt matrix B(m) is the H×H matrix with entries B_{ij}. Up to conjugation by a permutation matrix it is independent of the choice of representatives I_{j}; it is dependent only on the level of the order O.
