= Heinrich Brandt =

German mathematician (1886–1954)

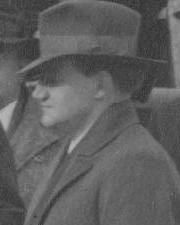
Heinrich Brandt, Oct 1930 in Jena

Heinrich Brandt (8 November 1886, in Feudingen – 9 October 1954, in Halle, Saxony-Anhalt) was a German mathematician who was the first to develop the concept of a groupoid.

Brandt studied at the University of Göttingen and, from 1910 to 1913, at the University of Strasbourg. In 1912 he attained his doctorate; he was a student of Heinrich Martin Weber. From 1913 he was assistant at the University of Karlsruhe (TH). He taught geometry and applied mathematics from 1921 at RWTH Aachen. From 1930 he was the chair for mathematics at the University of Halle.

A Brandt matrix is a computational way of describing the Hecke operator action on theta series as modular forms. The theory was developed in part by Brandt's student Martin Eichler. It offers an algorithmic approach for machine computation (in that theta series span spaces of modular forms); the theory is now considered by means of Brandt module.

== See also ==
- Brandt semigroup
