= Completely regular semigroup =

Algebraic structure

In mathematics, a completely regular semigroup is a semigroup in which every element is in some subgroup of the semigroup. The class of completely regular semigroups forms an important subclass of the class of regular semigroups, the class of inverse semigroups being another such subclass. Alfred H. Clifford was the first to publish a major paper on completely regular semigroups though he used the terminology "semigroups admitting relative inverses" to refer to such semigroups. The name "completely regular semigroup" stems from Lyapin's book on semigroups. In the Russian literature, completely regular semigroups are often called "Clifford semigroups". In the English literature, the name "Clifford semigroup" is used synonymously to "inverse Clifford semigroup", and refers to a completely regular inverse semigroup. In a completely regular semigroup, each Green H-class is a group and the semigroup is the union of these groups. Hence completely regular semigroups are also referred to as "unions of groups". Epigroups generalize this notion and their class includes all completely regular semigroups.

== Examples ==
"While there is an abundance of natural examples of inverse semigroups, for completely regular semigroups the examples (beyond completely simple semigroups) are mostly artificially constructed: the minimum ideal of a finite semigroup is completely simple, and the various relatively free completely regular semigroups are the other more or less natural examples."

== See also ==
- Special classes of semigroups
