= Clifford semigroup =

A Clifford semigroup (sometimes also called "inverse Clifford semigroup") is a completely regular inverse semigroup. It is an inverse semigroup with $xx^{-1}=x^{-1}x$. Examples of Clifford semigroups are groups and commutative inverse semigroups.

In a Clifford semigroup, $xy=yx \leftrightarrow x^{-1}y=yx^{-1}$.
