= Brandt semigroup =

In mathematics, Brandt semigroups are completely 0-simple inverse semigroups. In other words, they are semigroups without proper ideals and which are also inverse semigroups. They are built in the same way as completely 0-simple semigroups:

Let G be a group and $I, J$ be non-empty sets. Define a matrix $P$ of dimension $|I|\times |J|$ with entries in $G^0=G \cup \{0\}.$

Then, it can be shown that every 0-simple semigroup is of the form $S = (I\times G^0\times J)$ with the operation $(i,a,j)*(k,b,n) = (i,a p_{jk} b,n)$.

As Brandt semigroups are also inverse semigroups, the construction is more specialized and in fact, I = J (Howie 1995). Thus, a Brandt semigroup has the form $S = (I\times G^0\times I)$ with the operation $(i,a,j)*(k,b,n)=(i,a p_{jk} b,n)$, where the matrix $P$ is diagonal with only the identity element e of the group G in its diagonal.

== Remarks ==
1) The idempotents have the form (i, e, i) where e is the identity of G.

2) There are equivalent ways to define the Brandt semigroup. Here is another one:

ac = bc ≠ 0 or ca = cb ≠ 0 ⇒ a = b

ab ≠ 0 and bc ≠ 0 ⇒ abc ≠ 0

If a ≠ 0 then there are unique x, y, z for which xa = a, ay = a, za = y.

For all idempotents e and f nonzero, eSf ≠ 0

== See also ==
- Special classes of semigroups
