= Null semigroup =

In mathematics, a null semigroup (also called a zero semigroup) is a semigroup with an absorbing element, called zero, in which the product of any two elements is zero. If every element of a semigroup is a left zero then the semigroup is called a left zero semigroup; a right zero semigroup is defined analogously.

According to A. H. Clifford and G. B. Preston, "In spite of their triviality, these semigroups arise naturally in a number of investigations."

== Null semigroup ==
Let S be a semigroup with zero element 0. Then S is called a null semigroup if xy = 0 for all x and y in S.

=== Cayley table for a null semigroup ===
Let S = {0, a, b, c} be (the underlying set of) a null semigroup. Then the Cayley table for S is as given below:

Cayley table for a null semigroup
	0	a	b	c
0	0	0	0	0
a	0	0	0	0
b	0	0	0	0
c	0	0	0	0

== Left zero semigroup ==
A semigroup in which every element is a left zero element is called a left zero semigroup. Thus a semigroup S is a left zero semigroup if xy = x for all x and y in S.

=== Cayley table for a left zero semigroup ===
Let S = {a, b, c} be a left zero semigroup. Then the Cayley table for S is as given below:

Cayley table for a left zero semigroup
	a	b	c
a	a	a	a
b	b	b	b
c	c	c	c

== Right zero semigroup ==
A semigroup in which every element is a right zero element is called a right zero semigroup. Thus a semigroup S is a right zero semigroup if xy = y for all x and y in S.

=== Cayley table for a right zero semigroup ===
Let S = {a, b, c} be a right zero semigroup. Then the Cayley table for S is as given below:

Cayley table for a right zero semigroup
	a	b	c
a	a	b	c
b	a	b	c
c	a	b	c

== Properties ==
A non-trivial null (left/right zero) semigroup does not contain an identity element. It follows that the only null (left/right zero) monoid is the trivial monoid. On the other hand, a null (left/right zero) semigroup with an identity adjoined is called a find-unique (find-first/find-last) monoid.

The class of null semigroups is:

- closed under taking subsemigroups
- closed under taking quotient of subsemigroup
- closed under arbitrary direct products.

It follows that the class of null (left/right zero) semigroups is a variety of universal algebra, and thus a variety of finite semigroups. The variety of finite null semigroups is defined by the identity ab = cd.

== See also ==
- Right group
