= Section (category theory) =

Right inverse of a morphism

$f$ is a retraction of $g$. $g$ is a section of $f$. $1_Y$ is the identity morphism on an object $Y$.

In category theory, a branch of mathematics, a section is a right inverse of some morphism. Dually, a retraction is a left inverse of some morphism. In other words, if $f: X\to Y$ and $g: Y\to X$ are morphisms whose composition $f \circ g: Y\to Y$ is the identity morphism on $Y$, then $g$ is a section of $f$, and $f$ is a retraction of $g$.

Every section is a monomorphism (every morphism with a left inverse is left-cancellative), and every retraction is an epimorphism (every morphism with a right inverse is right-cancellative).

If there exists a section from $Y$ to $X$, then we say that $Y$ is a retract of $X$.

In algebra, sections are also called split monomorphisms and retractions are also called split epimorphisms. In an abelian category, if $f: X\to Y$ is a split epimorphism with split monomorphism $g: Y\to X$, then $X$ is isomorphic to the direct sum of $Y$ and the kernel of $f$. The synonym coretraction for section is sometimes seen in the literature, although rarely in recent work.

== Properties ==
- A section that is also an epimorphism is an isomorphism. Dually a retraction that is also a monomorphism is an isomorphism.

== Terminology ==
The concept of a retraction in category theory comes from the essentially similar notion of a retraction in topology: $f:X \to Y$ where $Y$ is a subspace of $X$ is a retraction in the topological sense, if it's a retraction of the inclusion map $i:Y\hookrightarrow X$ in the category theory sense. The concept in topology was defined by Karol Borsuk in 1931.

Borsuk's student, Samuel Eilenberg, was with Saunders Mac Lane the founder of category theory, and (as the earliest publications on category theory concerned various topological spaces) one might have expected this term to have initially been used. In fact, their earlier publications, up to, e.g., Mac Lane (1963)'s Homology, used the term right inverse. It was not until 1965 when Eilenberg and John Coleman Moore coined the dual term 'coretraction' that Borsuk's term was lifted to category theory in general. The term coretraction gave way to the term section by the end of the 1960s.

== Examples ==
In the category of sets, every monomorphism (injective function) with a non-empty domain is a section, and every epimorphism (surjective function) is a retraction; the latter statement is equivalent to the axiom of choice.

In the category of vector spaces over a field K, every monomorphism and every epimorphism splits; this follows from the fact that linear maps can be uniquely defined by specifying their values on a basis.

In the category of abelian groups, the epimorphism Z → Z/2Z which sends every integer to its remainder modulo 2 does not split; in fact the only morphism Z/2Z → Z is the zero map. Similarly, the natural monomorphism Z/2Z → Z/4Z doesn't split even though there is a non-trivial morphism Z/4Z → Z/2Z.

The categorical concept of a section is important in homological algebra, and is also closely related to the notion of a section of a fiber bundle in topology: in the latter case, a section of a fiber bundle is a section of the bundle projection map of the fiber bundle.

Given a quotient space $\bar X$ with quotient map $\pi\colon X \to \bar X$, a section of $\pi$ is called a transversal.

== Bibliography ==
- Mac Lane, Saunders (1978). Categories for the working mathematician (2nd ed.). Springer Verlag.
- Barry, Mitchell (1965). Theory of categories. Academic Press.

== See also ==
- Splitting lemma
- Inverse function § Left and right inverses
- Transversal (combinatorics)
