= Identity function =

Function that returns its argument unchanged

Graph of the identity function on the real numbers

In mathematics, an identity function, also called an identity relation, identity map or identity transformation, is a function that always returns the value that was used as its argument, unchanged. That is, when $f$ is the identity function, the equality $f(x)=x$ is true for all values of $x$ to which $f$ can be applied.

== Definition ==
Formally, if $X$ is a set, the identity function $f$ on $X$ is defined to be a function with $X$ as its domain and codomain, satisfying

$f(x)=x$ for all elements $x$ in $X$.

In other words, the function value $f(x)$ in the codomain $X$ is always the same as the input element $x$ in the domain $X$. The identity function on $X$ is clearly an injective function as well as a surjective function (its codomain is also its range), so it is bijective.

The identity function $f$ on $X$ is often denoted by $\mathrm{id}_X$.

In set theory, where a function is defined as a particular kind of binary relation, the identity function is given by the identity relation, or diagonal of $X$.

== Algebraic properties ==
If $f:X\rightarrow Y$ is any function, then $f\circ\mathrm{id}_X=f=\mathrm{id}_Y\circ f$, where "$\circ$" denotes function composition. In particular, $\mathrm{id}_X$ is the identity element of the monoid of all functions from $X$ to $X$ (under function composition).

Since the identity element of a monoid is unique, one can alternately define the identity function on $M$ to be this identity element. Such a definition generalizes to the concept of an identity morphism in category theory, where the endomorphisms of $M$ need not be functions.

== Properties ==
- The identity function is a linear operator when applied to vector spaces.
- In an $n$-dimensional vector space the identity function is represented by the identity matrix $I_n$, regardless of the basis chosen for the space.
- The identity function on the positive integers is a completely multiplicative function (essentially multiplication by 1), considered in number theory.
- In a metric space the identity function is trivially an isometry. An object without any symmetry has as its symmetry group the trivial group containing only this isometry (symmetry type $\mathrm{C}_1$).
- In a topological space, the identity function is always continuous.
- The identity function is idempotent.
- Every map from a set of a single element to itself is necessarily the identity map.

== See also ==
- Identity matrix
- Inclusion map
- Indicator function
