= Cancellation property =

Extension of "invertibility" in abstract algebra

In mathematics, the notion of cancellativity (or cancellability) is a generalization of the notion of invertibility that does not rely on an inverse element.

An element $a$ in a magma $(M,*)$ has the left cancellation property (or is left-cancellative) if for all $b$ and $c$ in $M$ , $a*b=a*c$ always implies that $b=c$ .

An element $a$ in a magma $(M,*)$ has the right cancellation property (or is right-cancellative) if for all $b$ and $c$ in $M$ , $b*a=c*a$ always implies that $b=c$ .

An element $a$ in a magma $(M,*)$ has the two-sided cancellation property (or is cancellative) if it is both left- and right-cancellative.

A magma $(M,*)$ is left-cancellative if all $a$ in the magma are left cancellative, and similar definitions apply for the right cancellative or two-sided cancellative properties.

In a semigroup, a left-invertible element is left-cancellative, and analogously for right and two-sided. If $a^{-1}$ is the left inverse of $a$ , then $a*b=a*c$ implies $a^{-1}*(a*b)=a^{-1}*(a*c)$, which implies $b=c$ by associativity.

For example, every quasigroup, and thus every group, is cancellative.

== Interpretation ==
An element $a$ in a magma $(M,*)$ is said to be left-cancellative if the function $g$ that sends each element $x$ of $M$ to $a*x$ is injective. That the function $g$ is injective implies that given some equality of the form $a*x=b$, where the only unknown is $x$, there is only one possible value of $x$ satisfying the equality. More precisely, we are able to define some function $f$, the inverse of $g$, such that for all $x$, $f(g(x))=f(a*x)=x$. Put another way, for all $x$ and $y$ in $M$, if $a*x=a*y$, then $x=y$.

Similarly, to say that the element $a$ is right-cancellative is to say that the function $h:x\mapsto x*a$ is injective, or equivalently that for all $x$ and $y$ in $M$, if $x*a=y*a$, then $x=y$.

== Examples of cancellative monoids and semigroups ==
The positive (equally non-negative) integers form a cancellative semigroup under addition. The non-negative integers form a cancellative monoid under addition. Each of these is an example of a cancellative magma that is not a quasigroup.

Any free semigroup or monoid obeys the cancellative law, and in general, any semigroup or monoid that embeds into a group (as the above examples clearly do) will obey the cancellative law.

In a different vein, (a subsemigroup of) the multiplicative semigroup of elements of a ring that are not zero divisors (which is just the set of all nonzero elements if the ring in question is a domain, like the integers) has the cancellation property. This remains valid even if the ring in question is noncommutative and/or nonunital.

== Non-cancellative algebraic structures ==
Although the cancellation property holds for addition and subtraction of integers, real and complex numbers, it does not hold for multiplication due to exception of multiplication by zero. The cancellation property does not hold for any nontrivial structure that has an absorbing element (such as $0$).

Whereas the integers and real numbers are not cancellative under multiplication, with the removal of $0$, they each form a cancellative structure under multiplication.

== See also ==
- Grothendieck group
- Invertible element
- Cancellative semigroup
- Integral domain
