= N-ary =

n-ary may refer to:

- The arity of a function, operation, or relation
  - n-ary associativity, a specific rule attached to n-ary functions
    - n-ary group, a generalization of group
- The radix of a numerical representation system
- The number of letters in an alphabet (formal languages)
  - An n-ary code
    - An n-ary Gray code
    - An n-ary Huffman code
- An n-ary tree

== See also ==
- n- (disambiguation)#Mathematics, science and technology
- Unary (disambiguation)
- Binary (disambiguation)
- Ternary (disambiguation)
