= N- =

== Chemistry ==
- n-, a lowercase prefix in chemistry denoting the straight-chain form of an open-chain compound in contrast to its branched isomer
- N-, an uppercase prefix in chemistry denoting that the substituent is bonded to the nitrogen, as in amines

== Mathematics, science and technology ==
The italicized letter n is used in mathematics to denote an arbitrary number (usually a non-negative integer).

- n-ary associativity
- n-ary code
- n-ary group
- n-back
- n-body problem
- n-category
- n-category number
- n-connected space
- n-curve
- n-dimensional space
- n-dimensional sequential move puzzle
- n-electron valence state perturbation theory (NEVPT)
- n-entity
- n-flake
- n-gram
- n-group
- n-monoid
- n-player game
- n-skeleton
- n-slit interferometer
- n-slit interferometric equation
- n-sphere
- n-vector
- n-vector model
