= Tree stack automaton =

A tree stack automaton (Note: not to be confused with a device with the same name introduced in 1990 by Wolfgang Golubski and Wolfram-M. Lippe) (plural: tree stack automata) is a formalism considered in automata theory. It is a finite-state automaton with the additional ability to manipulate a tree-shaped stack. It is an automaton with storage whose storage roughly resembles the configurations of a thread automaton. A restricted class of tree stack automata recognises exactly the languages generated by multiple context-free grammars (or linear context-free rewriting systems).

== Definition ==
=== Tree stack ===
A tree stack with stack pointer 1.2 and domain {ε, 1, 42, 1.2, 1.5, 1.5.3}

For a finite and non-empty set Γ, a tree stack over Γ is a tuple (t, p) where

- t is a partial function from strings of positive integers to the set Γ ∪ {@} with prefix-closed (Note: A set of strings is prefix-closed if for every element w in the set, all prefixes of w are also in the set.) domain (called tree),
- @ (called bottom symbol) is not in Γ and appears exactly at the root of t, and
- p is an element of the domain of t (called stack pointer).

The set of all tree stacks over Γ is denoted by TS(Γ).

The set of predicates on TS(Γ), denoted by Pred(Γ), contains the following unary predicates:

- true which is true for any tree stack over Γ,
- bottom which is true for tree stacks whose stack pointer points to the bottom symbol, and
- equals(γ) which is true for some tree stack (t, p) if t(p) = γ,

for every γ ∈ Γ.

The set of instructions on TS(Γ), denoted by Instr(Γ), contains the following partial functions:

- id: TS(Γ) → TS(Γ) which is the identity function on TS(Γ),
- push_{n,γ}: TS(Γ) → TS(Γ) which adds for a given tree stack (t,p) a pair (pn ↦ γ) to the tree t and sets the stack pointer to pn (i.e. it pushes γ to the n-th child position) if pn is not yet in the domain of t,
- up_{n}: TS(Γ) → TS(Γ) which replaces the current stack pointer p by pn (i.e. it moves the stack pointer to the n-th child position) if pn is in the domain of t,
- down: TS(Γ) → TS(Γ) which removes the last symbol from the stack pointer (i.e. it moves the stack pointer to the parent position), and
- set_{γ}: TS(Γ) → TS(Γ) which replaces the symbol currently under the stack pointer by γ,

for every positive integer n and every γ ∈ Γ.

Illustration of the instruction id on a tree stack

Illustration of the instruction push on a tree stack

Illustration of the instructions up and down on a tree stack

Illustration of the instruction set on a tree stack

=== Tree stack automata ===
A tree stack automaton is a 6-tuple A = (Q, Γ, Σ, q_{i}, δ, Q_{f}) where

- Q, Γ, and Σ are finite sets (whose elements are called states, stack symbols, and input symbols, respectively),
- q_{i} ∈ Q (the initial state),
- δ ⊆_{fin.} Q × (Σ ∪ {ε}) × Pred(Γ) × Instr(Γ) × Q (whose elements are called transitions), and
- Q_{f} ⊆ TS(Γ) (whose elements are called final states).

A configuration of A is a tuple (q, c, w) where

- q is a state (the current state),
- c is a tree stack (the current tree stack), and
- w is a word over Σ (the remaining word to be read).

A transition τ = (q_{1}, u, p, f, q_{2}) is applicable to a configuration (q, c, w) if

- q_{1} = q,
- p is true on c,
- f is defined for c, and
- u is a prefix of w.

The transition relation of A is the binary relation ⊢ on configurations of A that is the union of all the relations ⊢_{τ} for a transition τ = (q_{1}, u, p, f, q_{2}) where, whenever τ is applicable to (q, c, w), we have (q, c, w) ⊢_{τ} (q_{2}, f(c), v) and v is obtained from w by removing the prefix u.

The language of A is the set of all words w for which there is some state q ∈ Q_{f} and some tree stack c such that (q_{i}, c_{i}, w) ⊢^{*} (q, c, ε) where

- ⊢^{*} is the reflexive transitive closure of ⊢ and
- c_{i} = (t_{i}, ε) such that t_{i} assigns for ε the symbol @ and is undefined otherwise.

== Related formalisms ==
Tree stack automata are equivalent to Turing machines.

A tree stack automaton is called k-restricted for some positive natural number k if, during any run of the automaton, any position of the tree stack is accessed at most k times from below.

1-restricted tree stack automata are equivalent to pushdown automata and therefore also to context-free grammars. k-restricted tree stack automata are equivalent to linear context-free rewriting systems and multiple context-free grammars of fan-out at most k (for every positive integer k).
