= Operation (mathematics) =

Addition, multiplication, division, ...

Elementary arithmetic operations: +, plus (addition); −, minus (subtraction); ÷, obelus (division); ×, times (multiplication)

In mathematics, an operation is a function that takes as input a fixed number of elements of a set and returns an element of the same set. For example, addition on real numbers is an operation that accepts two real numbers and returns a real number. In general, the input values may be called "operands" or "arguments". The number of operands is the arity of the operation. The arity is usually one of $0, 1, 2, \ldots$.

The most commonly studied operations are binary operations (i.e., operations of arity 2), such as addition and multiplication, and unary operations (i.e., operations of arity 1), such as additive inverse and multiplicative inverse. An operation of arity 0, or nullary operation, is a constant. The mixed product is an example of an operation of arity 3, also called ternary operation.

The four classical operations are addition, subtraction, multiplication, and division. These operations form the foundation of arithmetic and are essential for performing calculations and solving problems in various fields.

Generally, the arity is taken to be finite. However, infinitary operations are sometimes considered, in which case the "usual" operations of finite arity are called finitary operations.

A partial operation is defined similarly to an operation, but with a partial mapping in place of a function.

== Types of operation ==
A binary operation takes two arguments $x$ and $y$, and returns the result $x\circ y$.

There are two common types of operations: unary and binary. Unary operations involve only one value, such as negation and trigonometric functions. Binary operations, on the other hand, take two values, and include addition, subtraction, multiplication, division, and exponentiation.

Operations can involve mathematical objects other than numbers. The logical values true and false can be combined using logic operations, such as and, or, and not. Vectors can be added and subtracted. Rotations can be combined using the function composition operation, performing the first rotation and then the second. Operations on sets include the binary operations union and intersection and the unary operation of complementation. Operations on functions include composition and convolution.

Operations may not be defined for every possible value of its domain. For example, in the real numbers one cannot divide by zero or take square roots of negative numbers. The values for which an operation is defined form a set called its domain of definition or active domain. The set which contains the values produced is called the codomain, but the set of actual values attained by the operation is its codomain of definition, active codomain, image or range. For example, in the real numbers, the squaring operation only produces non-negative numbers; the codomain is the set of real numbers, but the range is the non-negative numbers.

Operations can involve dissimilar objects: a vector can be multiplied by a scalar to form another vector (an operation known as scalar multiplication), and the inner product operation on two vectors produces a quantity that is scalar. An operation may or may not have certain properties, for example it may be associative, commutative, anticommutative, idempotent, and so on.

The values combined are called operands, arguments, or inputs, and the value produced is called the value, result, or output. Operations can have fewer or more than two inputs (including the case of zero input and infinitely many inputs).

An operator is similar to an operation in that it refers to the symbol or the process used to denote the operation. Hence, their point of view is different. For instance, one often speaks of "the operation of addition" or "the addition operation," when focusing on the operands and result, but one switch to "addition operator" (rarely "operator of addition"), when focusing on the process, or from the more symbolic viewpoint, the function +: X × X → X (where X is a set such as the set of real numbers).

== Definition ==
An n-ary operation ω on a set X is a function ω: X^{n} → X. The set X^{n} is called the domain of the operation, the output set is called the codomain of the operation, and the fixed non-negative integer n (the number of operands) is called the arity of the operation. Thus a unary operation has arity one, and a binary operation has arity two. An operation of arity zero, called a nullary operation, is simply an element of the codomain Y. An n-ary operation can also be viewed as an (n + 1)-ary relation that is total on its n input domains and unique on its output domain.

An n-ary partial operation ω from X^{n} to X is a partial mapping ω: X^{n} → X. An n-ary partial operation can also be viewed as an (n + 1)-ary relation that is unique on its output domain.

The above describes what is usually called a finitary operation, referring to the finite number of operands (the value n). There are obvious extensions where the arity is taken to be an infinite ordinal or cardinal, or even an arbitrary set indexing the operands.

Often, the use of the term operation implies that the domain of the function includes a power of the codomain (i.e. the Cartesian product of one or more copies of the codomain), although this is by no means universal, as in the case of dot product, where vectors are multiplied and result in a scalar. An n-ary operation ω: X^{n} → X is called an internal operation. An n-ary operation ω: X^{i} × S × X^{n − i − 1} → X where 0 ≤ i < n is called an external operation by the scalar set or operator set S. In particular for a binary operation, ω: S × X → X is called a left-external operation by S, and ω: X × S → X is called a right-external operation by S. An example of an internal operation is vector addition, where two vectors are added and result in a vector. An example of an external operation is scalar multiplication, where a vector is multiplied by a scalar and result in a vector.

An n-ary multifunction or multioperation ω is a mapping from a Cartesian power of a set into the set of subsets of that set, formally $\omega : X^n \rightarrow \mathcal{P}(X)$.

== Univalence ==
Partial operations were proposed by Bernard Neumann when he noted "partial (n+1)-arity relation R on a set X" satisfying $(a_1, a_2, ... a_n, b) \in R \ \text{and}\ (a_1, a_2, ... a_n, c) \in R \ \text{implies} \ b = c.$ Such a relation yields an n-ary operation on X^{n} written $(a_1, a_2, ... a_n) = b.$ Neumann was turning around the standard representation of a binary operation as a ternary relation and generalizing to arity n. This idea of expanding the realm of operations in universal algebra was taken up later by George Grätzer and Richard S. Pierce in their books. Complications resulting from this expansion reduce universal algebra to a study of mathematical relations and finitary relations. In discussing partial operations, both Grätzer and Pierce resort to relational systems. The basis for the expanded domain is that a relation that corresponds to a binary operation is a univalent relation.

== See also ==
- Hyperoperation
- Infix notation
- Operator (mathematics)
- Order of operations
