= Boris M. Schein =

Russian-American mathematician (1938–2023)

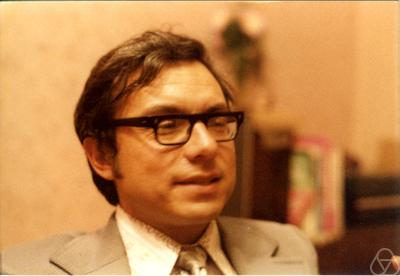
Schein in 1978

Boris Moiseyevich Schein (22 June 1938 – 4 October 2023) was a Russian-American mathematician, an expert in semigroups, and a Distinguished Professor in the Department of Mathematical Sciences at the University of Arkansas.

== Biography ==
Schein was born in Moscow on 22 June 1938, and moved to Saratov during World War II. He became interested in mathematics as a teenager, and came under the influence of Viktor Wagner, a professor of mathematics at Saratov State University. Schein did his undergraduate studies in Mechanics-Mathematics at Saratov State, and chose to specialize in geometry, Wagner's subject. In 1958 he solved the problem of characterizing the semigroups that could be embedded into an inverse semigroup. He graduated summa cum laude in 1960. He continued working as a graduate student with Wagner, and in 1962 defended a candidacy dissertation on semigroups of transformations at the Herzen State Pedagogical University of Russia in Saint Petersburg. He accepted a faculty position at Saratov in 1963, and defended his Doctor of Sciences thesis in 1966, again at Herzen State Pedagogical University.

In 1968, Schein was one of the founding editors of the journal Semigroup Forum, published by Springer-Verlag. However, in the 1970s his connections with Western mathematicians led to political difficulties, his correspondence with mathematicians outside the USSR was cut off, and his students were prevented from graduating. Eventually, in the late 1970s, his mentor Wagner retired from the university and Schein was dismissed.

In 1979, Schein was able to travel to Austria with his wife and daughter, and immediately he obtained a temporary visiting position at Tulane University in New Orleans. In 1980, he took a position at the University of Arkansas.

Boris Schein is known for the Schein index, which is the least number of "concepts" necessary to express the logical matrix of a binary relation as a Boolean sum, and where a concept is an outer product of logical vectors.

In 2011, Schein was named a distinguished reviewer of Zentralblatt MATH by the European Mathematical Society.

Boris M. Schein died on 4 October 2023, at the age of 85.
