= Finitary relation =

Property that assigns truth values to k-tuples of individuals

In mathematics, a finitary relation over a sequence of sets X_{1}, ..., X_{n} is a subset of the Cartesian product X_{1} × ... × X_{n}; that is, it is a set of n-tuples (x_{1}, ..., x_{n}), each being a sequence of elements x_{i} in the corresponding X_{i}. Typically, the relation describes a possible connection between the elements of an n-tuple. For example, the relation "x is divisible by y and z" consists of the set of triples such that when substituted to x, y and z, respectively, make the sentence true.

The non-negative integer n that gives the number of "places" in the relation is called the arity, adicity or degree of the relation. A relation with n "places" is variously called an n-ary relation, an n-adic relation or a relation of degree n. Relations with a finite number of places are called finitary relations (or simply relations if the context is clear). It is also possible to generalize the concept to infinitary relations with infinite sequences.

== Definitions ==
When two objects, qualities, classes, or attributes, viewed together by the mind, are seen under some connexion, that connexion is called a relation.

— Augustus De Morgan

Definition— An n-ary relation R on sets X_{1}, ..., X_{n} is a subset of the Cartesian product X_{1} × ... × X_{n}.

Since the definition is predicated on the underlying sets X_{1}, ..., X_{n}, R may be more formally defined as the (n + 1)-tuple (X_{1}, ..., X_{n}, G), where G, called the graph of R, is a subset of the Cartesian product X_{1} × ... × X_{n}.

As is often done in mathematics, the same symbol is used to refer to the mathematical object and an underlying set, so the statement (x_{1}, ..., x_{n}) ∈ R is often used to mean (x_{1}, ..., x_{n}) ∈ G, is read "x_{1}, ..., x_{n} are R-related", and is denoted using prefix notation by Rx_{1}⋯x_{n} and using postfix notation by x_{1}⋯x_{n}R. In the case where R is a binary relation, those statements are also denoted using infix notation by x_{1}Rx_{2}.

The following considerations apply:

- The set X_{i} is called the ith domain of R. In the case where R is a binary relation, X_{1} is also called simply the domain or set of departure of R, and X_{2} is also called the codomain or set of destination of R.
- When the elements of X_{i} are relations, X_{i} is called a nonsimple domain of R.
- The set of ∀x_{i} ∈ X_{i} such that Rx_{1}⋯x_{i−1}x_{i}x_{i+1}⋯x_{n} for at least one (x_{1}, ..., x_{n}) is called the ith domain of definition or active domain of R. In the case where R is a binary relation, its first domain of definition is also called simply the domain of definition or active domain of R, and its second domain of definition is also called the codomain of definition or active codomain of R.
- When the ith domain of definition of R is equal to X_{i}, R is said to be total on its ith domain (or on X_{i}, when this is not ambiguous). In the case where R is a binary relation, when R is total on X_{1}, it is also said to be left-total (or serial, in the special case where X_{1} = X_{2}), and when R is total on X_{2}, it is also said to be right-total or surjective.
- When ∀x ∀y ∈ X_{i}. ∀z ∈ X_{j}. xR_{ij}z ∧ yR_{ij}z ⇒ x = y, where i ∈ I, j ∈ J, R_{ij} = π_{ij} R, and {I, J} is a partition of {1, ..., n}, R is said to be unique on {X_{i}}_{i∈I}, and {X_{i}}_{i∈J} is called a primary key of R. In the case where R is a binary relation, when R is unique on {X_{1}}, it is also said to be left-unique or injective, and when R is unique on {X_{2}}, it is also said to be univalent or right-unique.
- When all X_{i} are the same set X, it is simpler to refer to R as an n-ary relation over X, called a homogeneous relation. Without this restriction, R is called a heterogeneous relation.
- When any of X_{i} is empty, the defining Cartesian product is empty, and the only relation over such a sequence of domains is the empty relation R = ∅.

Let a Boolean domain B be a two-element set, say, B = {0, 1}, whose elements can be interpreted as logical values, typically 0 = false and 1 = true. The characteristic function of R, denoted by χ_{R}, is the Boolean-valued function χ_{R}: X_{1} × ... × X_{n} → B, defined by χ_{R}((x_{1}, ..., x_{n})) = 1 if Rx_{1}⋯x_{n} and χ_{R}((x_{1}, ..., x_{n})) = 0 otherwise.

In applied mathematics, computer science and statistics, it is common to refer to a Boolean-valued function as an n-ary predicate. From the more abstract viewpoint of formal logic and model theory, the relation R constitutes a logical model or a relational structure, that serves as one of many possible interpretations of some n-ary predicate symbol.

Because relations arise in many scientific disciplines, as well as in many branches of mathematics and logic, there is considerable variation in terminology. Aside from the set-theoretic extension of a relational concept or term, the term "relation" can also be used to refer to the corresponding logical entity, either the logical comprehension, which is the totality of intensions or abstract properties shared by all elements in the relation, or else the symbols denoting these elements and intensions. Further, some writers of the latter persuasion introduce terms with more concrete connotations (such as "relational structure" for the set-theoretic extension of a given relational concept).

== Specific values of n ==
=== Nullary ===
Nullary (0-ary) relations count only two members: the empty nullary relation, which never holds, and the universal nullary relation, which always holds. This is because there is only one 0-tuple, the empty tuple (), and there are exactly two subsets of the (singleton) set of all 0-tuples. They are sometimes useful for constructing the base case of an induction argument.

=== Unary ===
Unary (1-ary) relations can be viewed as a collection of members (such as the collection of Nobel laureates) having some property (such as that of having been awarded the Nobel Prize).

Every nullary function is a unary relation.

=== Binary ===
Binary (2-ary) relations are the most commonly studied form of finitary relations. Homogeneous binary relations (where X_{1} = X_{2}) include

- Equality and inequality, denoted by signs such as = and < in statements such as "5 < 12", or
- Divisibility, denoted by the sign | in statements such as "13 | 143".

Heterogeneous binary relations include

- Set membership, denoted by the sign ∈ in statements such as "1 ∈ ℕ".

=== Ternary ===
Ternary (3-ary) relations include, for example, the binary functions, which relate two inputs and the output. All three of the domains of a homogeneous ternary relation are the same set.

== Example ==
Consider the ternary relation R "x thinks that y likes z" over the set of people P = { Alice, Bob, Charles, Denise }, defined by:

R = { (Alice, Bob, Denise), (Charles, Alice, Bob), (Charles, Charles, Alice), (Denise, Denise, Denise) }.

R can be represented equivalently by the following table:

Relation R "x thinks that y likes z"
x	y	z
Alice	Bob	Denise
Charles	Alice	Bob
Charles	Charles	Alice
Denise	Denise	Denise

Here, each row represents a triple of R, that is it makes a statement of the form "x thinks that y likes z". For instance, the first row states that "Alice thinks that Bob likes Denise". All rows are distinct. The ordering of rows is insignificant but the ordering of columns is significant.

The above table is also a simple example of a relational database, a field with theory rooted in relational algebra and applications in data management. Computer scientists, logicians, and mathematicians, however, tend to have different conceptions of what a general relation is, and what of what they are consistituted. For example, databases are designed to deal with empirical data, which is by definition finite, whereas in mathematics, relations with infinite arity (i.e., infinitary relation) are also considered.

== History ==
The logician Augustus De Morgan, in work published around 1860, was the first to articulate the notion of relation in anything like its present sense. He also stated the first formal results in the theory of relations (on De Morgan and relations, see Merrill 1990).

Charles Peirce, Gottlob Frege, Georg Cantor, Richard Dedekind and others advanced the theory of relations. Many of their ideas, especially on relations called orders, were summarized in The Principles of Mathematics (1903) where Bertrand Russell made free use of these results.

In 1970, Edgar Codd proposed a relational model for databases, thus anticipating the development of database management systems.

== See also ==
- Incidence structure
- Hypergraph
- Logic of relatives
- Logical matrix
- Partial order
- Predicate (mathematical logic)
- Projection (set theory)
- Reflexive relation
- Relation algebra
- Relational algebra
- Relational model
- Relations (philosophy)

== Bibliography ==
- Bourbaki, N. (1994), Elements of the History of Mathematics, translated by John Meldrum, Springer-Verlag
- Carnap, Rudolf (1958), Introduction to Symbolic Logic with Applications, Dover Publications
- Codd, Edgar Frank (June 1970). "A Relational Model of Data for Large Shared Data Banks" (PDF). Communications of the ACM. 13 (6): 377–387. doi:10.1145/362384.362685. S2CID 207549016.
- Codd, Edgar Frank (1990). The Relational Model for Database Management: Version 2 (PDF). Boston: Addison-Wesley. ISBN 978-0201141924.
- De Morgan, A. (1966) [1858], "On the syllogism, part 3", in Heath, P. (ed.), On the syllogism and other logical writings, Routledge, p. 119
- Halmos, P.R. (1960), Naive Set Theory, Princeton NJ: D. Van Nostrand Company
- Lawvere, F.W.; Rosebrugh, R (2003), Sets for Mathematics, Cambridge Univ. Press
- Lewis, C.I. (1918) A Survey of Symbolic Logic, Chapter 3: Applications of the Boole–Schröder Algebra, via Internet Archive
- Lucas, J.R. (1999), Conceptual Roots of Mathematics, Routledge
- Maddux, R.D. (2006), Relation Algebras, Studies in Logic and the Foundations of Mathematics, vol. 150, Elsevier Science
- Merrill, Dan D. (1990), Augustus De Morgan and the logic of relations, Kluwer
- Nivat, M. (1981). "Infinitary relations". In Astesiano, Egidio; Böhm, Corrado (eds.). Caap '81. Lecture Notes in Computer Science. Vol. 112. Springer Berlin Heidelberg. pp. 46–75. doi:10.1007/3-540-10828-9_54. ISBN 978-3-540-38716-9.
- Peirce, C.S. (1870), "Description of a Notation for the Logic of Relatives, Resulting from an Amplification of the Conceptions of Boole's Calculus of Logic", Memoirs of the American Academy of Arts and Sciences 9, 317–78, 1870. Reprinted, Collected Papers CP 3.45–149, Chronological Edition CE 2, 359–429.
- Peirce, C.S. (1984) Writings of Charles S. Peirce: A Chronological Edition, Volume 2, 1867–1871. Peirce Edition Project, eds. Indiana University Press.
- Russell, B. (1938) [1903], The Principles of Mathematics (2nd ed.), Cambridge Univ. Press.
- Suppes, P. (1972) [1960], Axiomatic Set Theory, Dover Publications
- Tarski, A. (1983) [1956], Logic, Semantics, Metamathematics, Papers from 1923 to 1938, translated by J.H. Woodger (1st ed.), Oxford University Press 2nd edition, J. Corcoran, ed. Indianapolis IN: Hackett Publishing.
- Ulam, S.M. and Bednarek, A.R. (1990), "On the Theory of Relational Structures and Schemata for Parallel Computation", pp. 477–508 in A.R. Bednarek and Françoise Ulam (eds.), Analogies Between Analogies: The Mathematical Reports of S.M. Ulam and His Los Alamos Collaborators, University of California Press, Berkeley, CA.
- Ulam, S.M. (1990), A.R. Bednarek; Françoise Ulam (eds.), Analogies Between Analogies: The Mathematical Reports of S.M. Ulam and His Los Alamos Collaborators, University of California Press
- Fraïssé, R. (2000) [1986], Theory of Relations, North Holland
