= BF-algebra =

In mathematics, BF-algebras are a class of algebraic structures arising out of a symmetric "yin yang" concept for Bipolar Fuzzy logic, the name was introduced by Andrzej Walendziak in 2007. The name covers discrete versions, but a canonical example arises in the BF space [-1,0]x[0,1] of pairs of (false-ness, truth-ness).

== Definition ==
A BF-algebra is a non-empty subset $X$ with a constant $0$ and a binary operation $*$ satisfying the following:

1. $x*x=0$
2. $x*0=x$
3. $0*(x*y)=y*x$

== Example ==
Let $Z$ be the set of integers and '$-$' be the binary operation 'subtraction'. Then the algebraic structure $(Z,-)$ obeys the following properties:

1. $x-x=0$
2. $x-0=x$
3. $0-(x-y)=y-x$
