= Heap (mathematics) =

Algebraic structure with a ternary operation

In abstract algebra, a semiheap is an algebraic structure consisting of a non-empty set H with a ternary operation denoted $[x,y,z] \in H$ that satisfies a modified associativity property:
$$\forall a,b,c,d,e \in H \quad [[a,b,c],d,e] = [a,[d,c,b],e] = [a,b,[c,d,e]].$$

A biunitary element h of a semiheap satisfies [h,h,k] = k = [k,h,h] for every k in H.

A heap is a semiheap in which every element is biunitary. It can be thought of as a group with the identity element "forgotten".

The term heap is derived from груда, Russian for 'heap' or 'pile'. Anton Sushkevich used the term in his Theory of Generalized Groups (1937) which influenced Viktor Wagner, promulgator of semiheaps, heaps, and generalized heaps. Груда contrasts with группа (group) which was taken into Russian by transliteration. Indeed, a heap has been called a groud in English text.

== Examples ==
=== Two element heap ===
Turn $H=\{a,b\}$ into the cyclic group $\mathrm{C}_2$, by defining $a$ the identity element, and $bb = a$. Then it produces the following heap:

$$[a,a,a]=a,\, [a,a,b]=b,\, [b,a,a]=b,\, [b,a,b]=a,$$
$$[a,b,a]=b,\, [a,b,b]=a,\, [b,b,a]=a,\, [b,b,b]=b.$$

Defining $b$ as the identity element and $aa = b$ would have given the same heap.

=== Heap of integers ===
If $x,y,z$ are integers, we can set $[x,y,z] = x-y+z$ to produce a heap. We can then choose any integer $k$ to be the identity of a new group on the set of integers, with the operation $*$
$$x*y = x+y-k$$
and inverse
$$x^{-1} = 2k-x.$$

=== Heap of a group ===
The previous two examples may be generalized to any group G by defining the ternary operation as $[x,y,z] = xy^{-1}z,$ using the multiplication and inverse of G.

=== Heap of a groupoid with two objects ===
The heap of a group may be generalized again to the case of a groupoid which has two objects A and B when viewed as a category. The elements of the heap may be identified with the morphisms from A to B, such that three morphisms x, y, z define a heap operation according to $[x,y,z] = xy^{-1}z.$

This reduces to the heap of a group if a particular morphism between the two objects is chosen as the identity. This intuitively relates the description of isomorphisms between two objects as a heap and the description of isomorphisms between multiple objects as a groupoid.

=== Heterogeneous relations ===
Let A and B be different sets and $\mathcal{B}(A,B)$ the collection of heterogeneous relations between them. For $p, q, r \in \mathcal{B}(A,B)$ define the ternary operator $[p, q, r] = p q^\mathrm{T} r$ where q^{T} is the converse relation of q. The result of this composition is also in $\mathcal{B}(A,B)$ so a mathematical structure has been formed by the ternary operation. Viktor Wagner was motivated to form this heap by his study of transition maps in an atlas which are partial functions. Thus a heap is more than a tweak of a group: it is a general concept including a group as a trivial case.

== Theorems ==
Theorem—A semiheap with a biunitary element e may be considered an involuted semigroup with operation given by ab = [a, e, b] and involution by a^{–1} = [e, a, e].

When the above construction is applied to a heap, the result is in fact a group. Note that the identity e of the group can be chosen to be any element of the heap.

Theorem—Every semiheap may be embedded in an involuted semigroup.

As in the study of semigroups, the structure of semiheaps is described in terms of ideals with an "i-simple semiheap" being one with no proper ideals. Mustafaeva translated the Green's relations of semigroup theory to semiheaps and defined a ρ class to be those elements generating the same principle two-sided ideal. He then proved that no i-simple semiheap can have more than two ρ classes.

He also described regularity classes of a semiheap S:
$$D(m,n) = \{a \mid \exists x \in S : a = a^n x a^m \}$$
where n and m have the same parity and the ternary operation of the semiheap applies at the left of a string from S. He proves that S can have at most 5 regularity classes. Mustafaev calls an ideal B "isolated" when $a^n \in B \implies a \in B .$ He then proves that when S = D(2,2), then every ideal is isolated and conversely.

Studying the semiheap Z(A, B) of heterogeneous relations between sets A and B, in 1974 K. A. Zareckii followed Mustafaev's lead to describe ideal equivalence, regularity classes, and ideal factors of a semiheap.

== Generalizations and related concepts ==
- A pseudoheap (or pseudogroud) satisfies the partial para-associative condition
  $$[[a,b,c],d,e] = [a,b,[c,d,e]] .$$
- A Malcev operation satisfies the identity law but not necessarily the para-associative law, that is, a ternary operation $f$ on a set $X$ satisfying the identity $f(x, x, y) = f(y, x, x) = y$. (See Congruence-permutable algebra.)
- A semiheap (or semigroud) is required to satisfy only the para-associative law but need not obey the identity law.
  An example of a semiheap that is not in general a heap is given by M a ring of matrices of fixed size with
  $$[x,y,z] = x \cdot y^\mathrm{T} \cdot z$$
  where • denotes matrix multiplication and T denotes matrix transpose.
- An idempotent semiheap is a semiheap where $[a,a,a] = a$ for all a.
- A generalised heap (or generalised groud) is an idempotent semiheap where
  $$[a,a,[b,b,x]] = [b,b,[a,a,x]]$$
  and
  $$[[x,a,a],b,b] = [[x,b,b],a,a]$$
  for all a and b.
  In a semiheap, the relation → defined by
  $$a \rightarrow b \Leftrightarrow [a,b,a] = a$$
  is transitive. A semiheap is a generalized heap if and only if → is an order relation, that is, is also reflexive (the semiheap is idempotent) and antisymmetric.

== See also ==
- n-ary associativity
- Torsor
