= Viktor Wagner =

Russian mathematician (1908–1981)

- Born: 4 November 1908; Saratov, Russia
- Died: 15 August 1981 (aged 72)
- Education: Moscow State University
- Awards: Lobachevsky Prize (1937)
- Scientific career
- Fields: Mathematics
- Workplaces: Saratov State University
- Doctoral advisor: Veniamin Kagan
- Doctoral students: Boris Schein

Viktor Vladimirovich Wagner (or Vagner; Russian: Виктор Владимирович Вагнер; 4 November 1908 – 15 August 1981) was a Russian mathematician. He is best known for his work in differential geometry and semigroup theory.

== Life ==
Viktor Wagner was born in Saratov and studied at Moscow State University, where Veniamin Kagan was his advisor. He became the first geometry chair at Saratov State University in the mid-1930s. He received the Lobachevsky Medal in 1937. He retired from this chair in 1978.

During his career, Wagner was also awarded "the Order of Lenin, the Order of the Red Banner, and the title of Honoured Scientist RSFSR. Moreover, he was also accorded that rarest of privileges in the USSR: permission to travel abroad."

Wagner is credited with noting that the collection of partial transformations on a set X forms a semigroup $\mathcal{PT}_X$ which is a subsemigroup of the semigroup $\mathcal{B}_X$ of binary relations on the same set X, where the semigroup operation is composition of relations. "This simple unifying observation, which is nevertheless an important psychological hurdle, is attributed by Schein (1986) to V.V. Wagner."

Wagner died suddenly in the middle of the night, from 15 August to 16 August, 1981, at the age of 72, in Brest, Byelorussian SSR.

== See also ==
- Inverse semigroup
- Heap

== Sources ==
- B. M. Schein (1981). "Obituary: Viktor Vladimirovich Vagner (1908–1981)". Semigroup Forum. 28: 189–200. doi:10.1007/BF02676643.
