= Increment and decrement operators =

Unary operators that add or subtract one from their operand, respectively

Increment and decrement operators are unary operators that increase or decrease their operand by one.

They are commonly found in imperative programming languages. C-like languages feature two versions (pre- and post-) of each operator with slightly different semantics.

In languages syntactically derived from B (including C and its various derivatives), the increment operator is written as ++ and the decrement operator is written as --. Several other languages use inc(x) and dec(x) functions.

The increment operator increases, and the decrement operator decreases, the value of its operand by 1. The operand must have an arithmetic or pointer data type, and must refer to a modifiable data object. Pointers values are increased (or decreased) by an amount that makes them point to the next (or previous) element adjacent in memory.

In languages that support both versions of the operators:

- The pre-increment and pre-decrement operators increment (or decrement) their operand by 1, and the value of the expression is the resulting incremented (or decremented) value.
- The post-increment and post-decrement operators increase (or decrease) the value of their operand by 1, but the value of the expression is the operand's value prior to the increment (or decrement) operation.

In languages where increment/decrement is not an expression (e.g., Go), only one version is needed (in the case of Go, post operators only).

Since the increment/decrement operator modifies its operand, use of such an operand more than once within the same expression can produce undefined results depending on the language. In C for example, in expressions such as x++ + x++, it is not clear in what sequence the subtraction and increment operations should be performed. Such expressions invoke undefined behavior, and should be avoided. However, in other languages, like Java, the behaviour is strictly well-defined; for example, x++ + ++x breaks the expression into three distinct steps, evaluating the left operand before the right operand.

In languages with typed pointers like C, the increment operator steps the pointer to the next item of that type -- increasing the value of the pointer by the size of that type. When a pointer (of the right type) points to any item in an array, incrementing (or decrementing) makes the pointer point to the "next" (or "previous") item of that array. Thus, incrementing a pointer to an integer makes it point to the next integer (typically increasing the pointer value by 4); incrementing a pointer to a structure of size 106 bytes makes it point to the next structure by increasing the pointer value by 106.

== Examples ==
The following C code fragment illustrates the difference between the pre and post increment and decrement operators:

int x = 0;
int y = 0;

// Increment operators
// Pre-increment: x is incremented by 1, then y is assigned the value of x
x = 1;
y = ++x; // x is now 2, y is also 2

// Post-increment: y is assigned the value of x, then x is incremented by 1
x = 1;
y = x++; // y is 1, x is now 2

// Decrement operators
// Pre-decrement: x is decremented by 1, then y is assigned the value of x
x = 1;
y = --x; // x is now 0, y is also 0

// Post-decrement: y is assigned the value of x, then x is decremented by 1
x = 1;
y = x--; // y is 1, x is now 0

In languages lacking these operators, equivalent results require an extra line of code:

# Pre-increment: y = ++x
x = 1
x = x + 1 # x is now 2 (can be written as "x += 1" in Python)
y = x # y is also 2

# Post-increment: y = x++
x = 1
y = x # y is 1
x = x + 1 # x is now 2

The post-increment operator is commonly used with array subscripts. For example:

// Sum the elements of an array
float sum(float a[], int n) {
    float total = 0.0f;
    int i = 0;

    while (i < n) {
        total += a[i++]; // Post-increment of i, which steps through n elements of the array
    }
    return total;
}

The post-increment operator is also commonly used with pointers:

// Copy one array to another
void copy(float src[], float dst[], int n) {
    // Loop that counts down from n to zero
    while (n-- > 0) {
        *dst++ = *src++; // Copies element *(src) to *(dst), then increments both pointers
    }
}

Other C-like languages have equivalent examples with the equivalent operators, such as C++, Java, and C#. For example, in Java:

int c = 2;
System.out.println(c++); // this statement displays 2, then c is incremented by 1 to 3.
System.out.println(++c); // this statement increments c by 1, then c is displayed.

The resulting output:

2
4

== Supporting languages ==
The following list, though not complete or all-inclusive, lists some of the major programming languages that support the increment and decrement operators.

- AWK
- Bash
- C
- C++
- C#
- CFML
- D
- Go (postfix increment only, also they are not expressions)
- Java
- JavaScript
- Objective-C
- GNU Octave
- PARI/GP
- Perl
- PHP
- PowerShell
- Vala
- Vex, a scripting language in Houdini
- Wolfram Language

Apple's Swift once supported these operators, but they have been depreciated since version 2.2 and removed as of version 3.0.

Pascal, Delphi, Modula-2, and Oberon uses functions (inc(x) and dec(x)) instead of operators. Tcl uses the incr command.

Notably Python, Ruby and Rust do not support these operators. In these languages, the equivalent of ++x and --x are x += 1 and x -= 1, respectively.

== History ==
The concept was introduced in the B programming language circa 1969 by Ken Thompson.

Thompson went a step further by inventing the ++ and -- operators, which increment or decrement; their prefix or postfix position determines whether the alteration occurs before or after noting the value of the operand. They were not in the earliest versions of B, but appeared along the way. People often guess that they were created to use the auto-increment and auto-decrement address modes provided by the DEC PDP-11 on which C and Unix first became popular. This is historically impossible, since there was no PDP-11 when B was developed. The PDP-7, however, did have a few 'auto-increment' memory cells, with the property that an indirect memory reference through them incremented the cell. This feature probably suggested such operators to Thompson; the generalization to make them both prefix and postfix was his own. Indeed, the auto-increment cells were not used directly in implementation of the operators, and a stronger motivation for the innovation was probably his observation that the translation of ++x was smaller than that of x = x + 1.

— Dennis Ritchie

== See also ==
- Augmented assignment – for += and -= operators
- PDP-7
- PDP-11
- Successor function
