= Unary function =

Function that takes one argument

In mathematics, a unary function is a function that takes one argument. A unary operation is a special kind of unary function, whose codomain coincides with its domain.

== Examples ==
The successor function is a unary function. More specifically, it is a unary operation on the set of natural numbers.

Many of the elementary functions are unary functions, including the trigonometric functions, logarithm with a specified base, exponentiation to a particular power or base, and hyperbolic functions.

== See also ==
- Arity
- Binary function
- Binary operation
- Iterated binary operation
- Ternary operation
- Unary operation

== Bibliography ==
- Foundations of Genetic Programming
