= Finitary =

Qualifies an operation with a finite number of arguments

In mathematics and logic, an operation is finitary if it has finite arity, i.e. if it has a finite number of input values. Similarly, an infinitary operation is one with an infinite number of input values.

In standard mathematics, an operation is finitary by definition. Therefore, these terms are usually only used in the context of infinitary logic.

== Finitary argument ==
A finitary argument is one which can be translated into a finite set of symbolic propositions starting from a finite set of axioms. In other words, it is a proof (including all assumptions) that can be written on a large enough sheet of paper.

By contrast, infinitary logic studies logics that allow infinitely long statements and proofs. In such a logic, one can regard the existential quantifier, for instance, as derived from an infinitary disjunction.

== History ==
Logicians in the early 20th century aimed to solve the problem of foundations, such as, "What is the true base of mathematics?" The program was to be able to rewrite all mathematics using an entirely syntactical language without semantics. In the words of David Hilbert (referring to geometry), "it does not matter if we call the things chairs, tables and beer mugs or points, lines and planes."

The stress on finiteness came from the idea that human mathematical thought is based on a finite number of principles and all the reasonings follow essentially one rule: the modus ponens. The project was to fix a finite number of symbols (essentially the numerals 1, 2, 3, ... the letters of alphabet and some special symbols like "+", "⇒", "(", ")", etc.), give a finite number of propositions expressed in those symbols, which were to be taken as "foundations" (the axioms), and some rules of inference which would model the way humans make conclusions. From these, regardless of the semantic interpretation of the symbols the remaining theorems should follow formally using only the stated rules (which make mathematics look like a game with symbols more than a science) without the need to rely on ingenuity. The hope was to prove that from these axioms and rules all the theorems of mathematics could be deduced. That aim is known as logicism.

== See also ==
- Constructivism (philosophy of mathematics) – Philosphical view that existence proofs must be constructive
