= Operand =

Object of a mathematical operation, quantity on which an operation is performed

In mathematics, an operand is the object of a mathematical operation, i.e., it is the object or quantity that is operated on.

Unknown operands in equalities of expressions can be found by equation solving.

== Example ==
The following arithmetic expression shows an example of operators and operands:

$$3 + 6 = 9$$

In the above example, '+' is the symbol for the operation called addition.

The operand '3' is one of the inputs (quantities) followed by the addition operator, and the operand '6' is the other input necessary for the operation.

The result of the operation is 9. (The number '9' is also called the sum of the augend 3 and the addend 6.)

An operand, then, is also referred to as "one of the inputs (quantities) for an operation".

== Notation ==
=== Expressions as operands ===
Operands may be nested, and may consist of expressions also made up of operators with operands.

$$(3 + 5) \times 2$$

In the above expression '(3 + 5)' is the first operand for the multiplication operator and '2' the second. The operand '(3 + 5)' is an expression in itself, which contains an addition operator, with the operands '3' and '5'.

Rules of precedence affect which values form operands for which operators:

$$3 + 5 \times 2$$

In the above expression, the multiplication operator has the higher precedence than the addition operator, so the multiplication operator has operands of '5' and '2'. The addition operator has operands of '3' and '5 × 2'.

=== Positioning of operands ===
Depending on the mathematical notation being used the position of an operator in relation to its operand(s) may vary. In everyday usage infix notation is the most common, however other notations also exist, such as the prefix and postfix notations. These alternate notations are most common within computer science.

Below is a comparison of three different notations — all represent an addition of the numbers '1' and '2'

$1 + 2$ (infix notation)

$+\;1\;2$ (prefix notation)

$1\;2\;+$ (postfix notation)

=== Infix and the order of operation ===
In a mathematical expression, the order of operation is carried out from left to right. Start with the leftmost value and seek the first operation to be carried out in accordance with the order specified above (i.e., start with parentheses and end with the addition/subtraction group). For example, in the expression

$$4 \times 2^2 - (2 + 2^2)$$,

the first operation to be acted upon is any and all expressions found inside a parenthesis. So beginning at the left and moving to the right, find the first (and in this case, the only) parenthesis, that is, (2 + 2^{2}). Within the parenthesis itself is found the expression 2^{2}. The reader is required to find the value of 2^{2} before going any further. The value of 2^{2} is 4. Having found this value, the remaining expression looks like this:

$$4 \times 2^2 - (2 + 4)$$

The next step is to calculate the value of expression inside the parenthesis itself, that is, (2 + 4) = 6. Our expression now looks like this:

$$4 \times 2^2 - 6$$

Having calculated the parenthetical part of the expression, we start over again beginning with the left most value and move right. The next order of operation (according to the rules) is exponents. Start at the left most value, that is, 4, and scan your eyes to the right and search for the first exponent you come across. The first (and only) expression we come across that is expressed with an exponent is 2^{2}. We find the value of 2^{2}, which is 4. What we have left is the expression

$$4 \times 4 - 6$$.

The next order of operation is multiplication. 4 × 4 is 16. Now our expression looks like this:

$$16 - 6$$

The next order of operation according to the rules is division. However, there is no division operator sign (÷) in the expression, 16 − 6. So we move on to the next order of operation, i.e., addition and subtraction, which have the same precedence and are done left to right.

$$16 - 6 = 10$$.

So the correct value for our original expression, 4 × 2^{2} − (2 + 2^{2}), is 10.

It is important to carry out the order of operation in accordance with rules set by convention. If the reader evaluates an expression but does not follow the correct order of operation, the reader will come forth with a different value. The different value will be the incorrect value because the order of operation was not followed. The reader will arrive at the correct value for the expression if and only if each operation is carried out in the proper order.

=== Arity ===
The number of operands of an operator is called its arity. Based on arity, operators are chiefly classified as nullary (no operands), unary (1 operand), binary (2 operands), ternary (3 operands). Higher arities are less frequently denominated through a specific terms, all the more when function composition or currying can be used to avoid them. Other terms include:

- quaternary, tetranary (4)
- quinary, quintenary, quinquennary (5)
- hexanary, senary, sexenary (6)
- septenary (7)
- octonary (8)
- nonary, novenary (9)
- denary (10)
- undenary (11)
- duodenary (12)
- tridecennary (13)
- quindenary (15)
- vigenary (20)
- quadringenary (40)
- quinquagenary (50)
- sexagenary (60)
- septuagenary (70)
- octogenary (80)
- nonagenary (90)
- centenary (100)
- sesquicentenary (150)
- bicentenary (200)
- tercentenary, tricentenary (300)
- quadringentenary, quatercentenary (400)
- quincentenary (500)
- sexcentenary (600)
- septcentenary (700)
- octocentenary (800)

== Computer science ==
In computer programming languages, the definitions of operator and operand are almost the same as in mathematics.

In computing, an operand is the part of a computer instruction which specifies what data is to be manipulated or operated on, while at the same time representing the data itself. A computer instruction describes an operation such as add or multiply X, while the operand (or operands, as there can be more than one) specify on which X to operate as well as the value of X.

Additionally, in assembly language, an operand is a value (an argument) on which the instruction, named by mnemonic, operates. The operand may be a processor register, a memory address, a literal constant, or a label. A simple example (in the x86 architecture) is

MOV BX, AX

where the value in register operand AX is to be moved (MOV) into register BX. Depending on the instruction, there may be zero, one, two, or more operands.

== See also ==
- Instruction set
- Opcode
