= Iterated binary operation =

Repeated application of an operation to a sequence

In mathematics, an iterated binary operation is an extension of a binary operation on a set S to a function on finite sequences of elements of S through repeated application. Common examples include the extension of the addition operation to the summation operation, and the extension of the multiplication operation to the product operation. Other operations, e.g., the set-theoretic operations union and intersection, are also often iterated, but the iterations are not given separate names. In print, summation and product are represented by special symbols; but other iterated operators often are denoted by larger variants of the symbol for the ordinary binary operator. Thus, the iterations of the four operations mentioned above are denoted

$\sum,\ \prod,\ \bigcup,$ and $\bigcap$, respectively.

More generally, iteration of a binary function is generally denoted by a slash: iteration of $f$ over the sequence $(a_{1}, a_{2} \ldots, a_{n})$ is denoted by $f / (a_{1}, a_{2} \ldots, a_{n})$, following the notation for reduce in Bird–Meertens formalism.

In general, there is more than one way to extend a binary operation to operate on finite sequences, depending on whether the operator is associative, and whether the operator has identity elements.

== Definition ==
Denote by a_{j,k}, with j ≥ 0 and k ≥ j, the finite sequence of length k − j of elements of S, with members (a_{i}), for j ≤ i < k. Note that if k = j, the sequence is empty.

For f : S × S → S, define a new function F_{l} on finite nonempty sequences of elements of S, where
$$F_l(\mathbf{a}_{0,k})= \begin{cases}
a_0, &k=1\\
f(F_l(\mathbf{a}_{0,k-1}), a_{k-1}), &k>1.
\end{cases}$$

Similarly, define
$$F_r(\mathbf{a}_{0,k}) = \begin{cases}
a_0, &k=1\\
f(a_0, F_r(\mathbf{a}_{1,k})), &k>1.
\end{cases}$$

If f has a unique left identity e, the definition of F_{l} can be modified to operate on empty sequences by defining the value of F_{l} on an empty sequence to be e (the previous base case on sequences of length 1 becomes redundant). Similarly, F_{r} can be modified to operate on empty sequences if f has a unique right identity.

If f is associative, then F_{l} equals F_{r}, and we can simply write F. Moreover, if an identity element e exists, then it is unique (see Monoid).

If f is commutative and associative, then F can operate on any non-empty finite multiset by applying it to an arbitrary enumeration of the multiset. If f moreover has an identity element e, then this is defined to be the value of F on an empty multiset. If f is idempotent, then the above definitions can be extended to finite sets.

If S also is equipped with a metric or more generally with topology that is Hausdorff, so that the concept of a limit of a sequence is defined in S, then an infinite iteration on a countable sequence in S is defined exactly when the corresponding sequence of finite iterations converges. Thus, e.g., if a_{0}, a_{1}, a_{2}, a_{3}, … is an infinite sequence of real numbers, then the infinite product $\prod_{i=0}^\infty a_i$ is defined, and equal to $\lim\limits_{n\to\infty}\prod_{i=0}^na_i,$ if and only if that limit exists.

== Non-associative binary operation ==
The general, non-associative binary operation is given by a magma. The act of iterating on a non-associative binary operation may be represented as a binary tree.

== Basic iterated operations ==
Iterated operations
Area of mathematics	Sum				Product			
Area of mathematics	Name	Operation	Definition	Symbol	Name	Operation	Definition	Symbol
Arithmetic	Summation	Addition	Sum of numbers	$\sum$	Iterated product	Multiplication	Product of numbers	$\prod$
Set theory	Union of a sequence of sets	Set union	All elements of sets	$\bigcup$	Intersection of a sequence of sets	Set intersection	Common elements	$\bigcap$
Logic	Existential quantifier	Disjunction	Disjunction of statements	$\bigvee$	Universal quantifier	Conjunction	Conjunction of statements	$\bigwedge$
Divisibility theory	Least common multiple	Least common multiple	The smallest number that is a multiple of all the terms	$\operatorname{lcm}$	Greatest common divisor	Greatest common divisor	The greatest number that is a divisor of all the terms	$\gcd$
Category theory	Coproduct	Disjoint union	Coproduct of objects	$\coprod$	Product	Cartesian product	Product of objects	$\prod$

== Notation ==
The iterated binary operation is written as:

$$\mathop{\bigstar}_{k=1}^{n} a_k$$

Meaning of symbols:

Symbol	Meaning
$\bigstar$	Iterated binary operation symbol
$k$	Index variable
$k=1$	Lower bound
$k=n$ or $n$	Upper bound
$a_k$	k-th element

Example:

$$\mathop{\bigstar}_{k=1}^{4} a_k = \mathop{\bigstar}_{k=1}^{k=4} a_k = a_1 \star a_2 \star a_3 \star a_4$$

General form:

$$\mathop{\bigstar}_{k \in K} a_k$$

Restricted form:

$$\mathop{\bigstar}_{1 \le k \le n \atop k \equiv 0 \pmod 2} a_k$$

Infinite version:

$$\mathop{\bigstar}_{k=1}^{\infty} a_k=\mathop{\bigstar}_{k=1}^{k\to\infty} a_k$$

== Properties ==
Let $(S,\star)$ be a structure with associative operation $\star$:

- Single element:

$$\mathop{\bigstar}_{k=n}^{n} a_k = a_n$$

- Expansion:

$$\mathop{\bigstar}_{k=1}^{n} a_k = a_1 \star a_2 \star \dots \star a_n$$

- Recursion:

$$\mathop{\bigstar}_{k=1}^{n} a_k = \left(\mathop{\bigstar}_{k=1}^{n-1} a_k\right)\star a_n$$

- Right recursion:

$$\mathop{\bigstar}_{k=1}^{n} a_k = a_1 \star \left(\mathop{\bigstar}_{k=2}^{n} a_k\right)$$

- Splitting:

$$\left(\mathop{\bigstar}_{k=1}^{m} a_k\right)\star\left(\mathop{\bigstar}_{k=m+1}^{n} a_k\right)=\mathop{\bigstar}_{k=1}^{n} a_k$$

- Permutation invariance:

$$\mathop{\bigstar}_{k=1}^{n} a_k = \mathop{\bigstar}_{k=1}^{n} a_{\sigma(k)}$$

- Empty product (monoid):

$$\mathop{\bigstar}_{k=1}^{0} a_k = e$$

- Idempotence:

if $a \star a = a$, then $\mathop{\bigstar}_{k=1}^{n} a = a$

- Constant sequence:

$$\mathop{\bigstar}_{k=1}^{n} a = a \star \cdots \star a$$

== Identity element and empty set ==
If $(S, \star, e)$ is a monoid, then:

- Empty product = identity element
- Empty sum = 0 (in arithmetic monoids)

== Computer science ==
In functional programming, iterated binary operations correspond to higher-order functions such as fold or reduce.

== See also ==
- Unary operation
- Unary function
- Binary operation
- Binary function
- Ternary operation
