= Unary operation =

Mathematical operation with only one operand

In mathematics, a unary operation is an operation with only one operand, i.e. a single input. This is in contrast to binary operations, which use two operands. An example is any function $f : A \rightarrow A$, where A is a set; the function $f$ is a unary operation on A.

Common notations are prefix notation (e.g. negation ¬, additive inverse −), postfix notation (e.g. factorial n!), functional notation (e.g. sin x or sin(x)), and superscripts (e.g. transpose A^{T}). Other notations exist as well, for example, in the case of the square root, a horizontal bar extending the square root sign over the argument can indicate the extent of the argument.

== Examples ==
=== Absolute value ===
Obtaining the absolute value of a number is a unary operation. This function is defined as
$$|n| = \begin{cases} n, & \mbox{if } n\geq0 \\ -n, & \mbox{if } n<0 \end{cases}$$
where $|n|$ is the absolute value of $n$.

=== Negation ===
Negation is used to find the negative value of a single number. Here are some examples:

$$-(3) = -3$$

$$-( -3) = 3$$

=== Factorial ===
For any positive integer n, the product of the integers less than or equal to n is a unary operation called factorial. In the context of complex numbers, the gamma function is a unary operation extension of factorial.

=== Trigonometry ===
In trigonometry, the trigonometric functions, such as $\sin$, $\cos$, and $\tan$, can be seen as unary operations. This is because it is possible to provide only one term as input for these functions and retrieve a result. By contrast, binary operations, such as addition, require two different terms to compute a result.

=== Examples from programming languages ===
Below is a table summarizing common unary operators along with their symbols, description, and examples:

Operator	Symbol	Description	Example
Increment	++	Increases the value of a variable by 1	x = 2; ++x; // x is now 3
Decrement	--	Decreases the value of a variable by 1	y = 10; --y; // y is now 9
Unary Plus	+	Indicates a positive value	a = -5; b = +a; // b is -5
Unary Minus	-	Indicates a negative value	c = 4; d = -c; // d is -4
Logical NOT	!	Negates the truth value of a Boolean expression	flag = true; result = !flag; // result is false
Bitwise NOT	~	Bitwise negation, flips the bits of an integer	num = 5; result = ~num; // result is -6

==== JavaScript ====
In JavaScript, these operators are unary:

- Increment: ++x, x++
- Decrement: --x, x--
- Positive: +x
- Negative: -x
- Ones' complement: ~x
- Logical negation: !x

==== Python ====
In Python, there are no increment or decrement operators, but the following unary operators are available:

- Positive: +x
- Negative: -x
- Ones' complement: ~x
- Logical negation: not x

==== C family of languages ====
In the C family of languages, the following operators are unary:

- Increment: ++x, x++
- Decrement: --x, x--
- Address: &x
- Indirection: *x
- Positive: +x
- Negative: -x
- Ones' complement: ~x
- Logical negation: !x
- Sizeof: sizeof x, sizeof(type-name)
- Cast: (type-name) cast-expression

==== Unix shell (Bash) ====
In the Unix shell (Bash/Bourne Shell), e.g., the following operators are unary:

- Pre and Post-Increment: ++$x, $x++
- Pre and Post-Decrement: --$x, $x--
- Positive: +$x
- Negative: -$x
- Logical negation: !$x
- Simple expansion: $x
- Complex expansion: ${#x}

==== PowerShell ====
In the PowerShell, the following operators are unary:

- Increment: ++$x, $x++
- Decrement: --$x, $x--
- Positive: +$x
- Negative: -$x
- Logical negation: !$x
- Invoke in current scope: .$x
- Invoke in new scope: &$x
- Cast: [type-name] cast-expression
- Cast: +$x
- Array: ,$array

== See also ==
- Unary function
- Binary operation
- Iterated binary operation
- Binary function
- Ternary operation
- Arity
- Operation (mathematics)
- Operator (programming)
