= Infix notation =

Mathematics notation with operators between operands

Infix notation is the notation commonly used in arithmetical and logical formulae and statements. It is characterized by the placement of operators between operands—"infixed operators"—such as the plus sign in 2 + 2.

== Usage ==
Binary relations are often denoted by an infix symbol such as set membership a ∈ A when the set A has a for an element. In geometry, perpendicular lines a and b are denoted $a \perp b \ ,$ and in projective geometry two points b and c are in perspective when $b \ \doublebarwedge \ c$ while they are connected by a projectivity when $b \ \barwedge \ c .$

Infix notation is more difficult to parse by computers than prefix notation (e.g. + 2 2) or postfix notation (e.g. 2 2 +). However many programming languages use it due to its familiarity. It is more used in arithmetic, e.g. 5 × 6.

== Further notations ==
Infix notation may also be distinguished from function notation, where the name of a function suggests a particular operation, and its arguments are the operands. An example of such a function notation would be S(1, 3) in which the function S denotes addition ("sum"): S (1, 3) = 1 + 3 = 4.

== Order of operations ==
In infix notation, unlike in prefix or postfix notations, parentheses surrounding groups of operands and operators are necessary to indicate the intended order in which operations are to be performed. In the absence of parentheses, certain precedence rules determine the order of operations.

== See also ==
- Tree traversal: Infix (In-order) is also a tree traversal order. It is described in a more detailed manner on this page.
- Calculator input methods: comparison of notations as used by pocket calculators
- Postfix notation, also called Reverse Polish notation
- Prefix notation, also called Polish notation
- Shunting yard algorithm, used to convert infix notation to postfix notation or to a tree
- Operator (computer programming)
- Subject–verb–object word order
