= Argument of a function =

Input to a mathematical function

In mathematics, an argument of a function is a value provided to obtain the function's result. It is also called an independent variable.

For example, the binary function $f(x,y) = x^2 + y^2$ has two arguments, $x$ and $y$, in an ordered pair $(x, y)$. The hypergeometric function is an example of a four-argument function. The number of arguments that a function takes is called the arity of the function. A function that takes a single argument as input, such as $f(x) = x^2$, is called a unary function. A function of two or more variables is considered to have a domain consisting of ordered pairs or tuples of argument values. The argument of a circular function is an angle. The argument of a hyperbolic function is a hyperbolic angle.

A mathematical function has one or more arguments in the form of independent variables designated in the definition, which can also contain parameters. The independent variables are mentioned in the list of arguments that the function takes, whereas the parameters are not. For example, in the logarithmic function $f(x) = \log_b(x),$ the base $b$ is considered a parameter.

Sometimes, subscripts can be used to denote arguments. For example, we can use subscripts to denote the arguments with respect to which partial derivatives are taken.

The use of the term "argument" in this sense developed from astronomy, which historically used tables to determine the spatial positions of planets from their positions in the sky (ephemerides). These tables were organized according to measured angles called arguments, literally "that which elucidates something else."

== See also ==
- Domain of a function – Set of all things that may be the input of a mathematical function
- Function prototype – Declaration of a function's name and type signature but not body
- Parameter (computer programming) – Variable that represents an argument to a function
- Propositional function – Expression in propositional calculus
- Type signature – Defines the inputs and outputs for a function, subroutine or method
- Value (mathematics) – Notion in mathematics
