= N-ary group =

Concept in mathematics

In mathematics, and in particular universal algebra, the concept of an n-ary group (also called a polyadic group, an n-group, or a multiary group) is a generalization of the concept of a group to a set G with an n-ary operation instead of a binary operation. By an n-ary operation is meant any map f: G^{n} → G from the n-th Cartesian power of G to G. The axioms for an n-ary group are defined in such a way that they reduce to those of a group in the case n = 2. The earliest work on these structures was done in 1904 by Kasner and in 1928 by Dörnte; the first systematic account of (what were then called) polyadic groups was given in 1940 by Emil Leon Post in a famous 143-page paper in the Transactions of the American Mathematical Society.

== Axioms ==
=== Associativity ===
The easiest axiom to generalize is the associative law. Ternary associativity is the polynomial identity (abc)de = a(bcd)e = ab(cde), i.e. the equality of the three possible bracketings of the string abcde in which any three consecutive symbols are bracketed. (Here it is understood that the equations hold for all choices of elements a, b, c, d, e in G.) In general, n-ary associativity is the equality of the n possible bracketings of a string consisting of n + (n − 1) = 2n − 1 distinct symbols with any n consecutive symbols bracketed. A set G that is closed under an associative n-ary operation is called an n-ary semigroup. A set G that is closed under any (not necessarily associative) n-ary operation is called an n-ary groupoid.

=== Inverses / unique solutions ===
The inverse axiom is generalized as follows: in the case of binary operations the existence of an inverse means ax = b has a unique solution for x, and likewise xa = b has a unique solution. In the ternary case we generalize this to abx = c, axb = c and xab = c each having unique solutions, and the n-ary case follows a similar pattern of existence of unique solutions and we get an n-ary quasigroup.

=== Definition of n-ary group ===
An n-ary group is an n-ary semigroup that is also an n-ary quasigroup.

=== Structure of n-ary groups ===
Post gave a structure theorem for an n-ary group in terms of an associated group.

=== Identity / neutral elements ===
In the 2-ary case, there can be zero or one identity elements: the empty set is a 2-ary group, since the empty set is both a semigroup and a quasigroup, and every inhabited 2-ary group is a group. In n-ary groups for n ≥ 3 there can be zero, one, or many identity elements.

An n-ary groupoid (G, f) with f = (x_{1} ◦ x_{2} ◦ ⋯ ◦ x_{n}), where (G, ◦) is a group is called reducible or derived from the group (G, ◦). In 1928 Dörnte published the first main results: An n-ary groupoid that is reducible is an n-ary group, however for all n > 2 there exist inhabited n-ary groups that are not reducible. In some n-ary groups there exists an element e (called an n-ary identity or neutral element) such that any string of n-elements consisting of all e's, apart from one place, is mapped to the element at that place. E.g., in a quaternary group with identity e, eeae = a for every a.

An n-ary group containing a neutral element is reducible. Thus, an n-ary group that is not reducible does not contain such elements. There exist n-ary groups with more than one neutral element. If the set of all neutral elements of an n-ary group is non-empty it forms an n-ary subgroup.

Some authors include an identity in the definition of an n-ary group but as mentioned above such n-ary operations are just repeated binary operations. Groups with intrinsically n-ary operations do not have an identity element.

=== Weaker axioms ===
The axioms of associativity and unique solutions in the definition of an n-ary group are stronger than they need to be. Under the assumption of n-ary associativity it suffices to postulate the existence of the solution of equations with the unknown at the start or end of the string, or at one place other than the ends; e.g., in the 6-ary case, xabcde = f and abcdex = f, or an expression like abxcde = f. Then it can be proved that the equation has a unique solution for x in any place in the string. The associativity axiom can also be given in a weaker form.

== Example ==
The following is an example of a three element ternary group, one of four such groups

$$\begin{matrix}
aaa = a & aab = b & aac = c & aba = c & abb = a & abc = b & aca = b & acb = c & acc = a\\
baa = b & bab = c & bac = a & bba = a & bbb = b & bbc = c & bca = c & bcb = a & bcc = b\\
caa = c & cab = a & cac = b & cba = b & cbb = c & cbc = a & cca = a & ccb = b & ccc = c
\end{matrix}$$

== (n,m)-group ==
The concept of an n-ary group can be further generalized to that of an (n,m)-group, also known as a vector valued group, which is a set G with a map f: G^{n} → G^{m} where n > m, subject to similar axioms as for an n-ary group except that the result of the map is a word consisting of m letters instead of a single letter. So an (n,1)-group is an n-ary group. (n,m)-groups were introduced by G. Ĉupona in 1983.

== See also ==
- Universal algebra
