= Binary function =

Function that takes two inputs

In mathematics, a binary function (also called bivariate function, or function of two variables) is a function that takes two inputs.

Precisely stated, a function $f$ is binary if there exist sets $X, Y, Z$ such that
$$\,f \colon X \times Y \rightarrow Z$$
where $X \times Y$ is the Cartesian product of $X$ and $Y.$

== Alternative definitions ==
Set-theoretically, a binary function can be represented as a subset of the Cartesian product $X \times Y \times Z$, where $(x,y,z)$ belongs to the subset if and only if $f(x,y) = z$. Conversely, a subset $R$ defines a binary function if and only if for any $x \in X$ and $y \in Y$, there exists a unique $z \in Z$ such that $(x,y,z)$ belongs to $R$. $f(x,y)$ is then defined to be this $z$.

Alternatively, a binary function may be interpreted as simply a function from $X \times Y$ to $Z$. Even when thought of this way, however, one generally writes $f(x,y)$ instead of $f((x,y))$. (That is, the same pair of parentheses is used to indicate both function application and the formation of an ordered pair.)

== Examples ==
Division of whole numbers can be thought of as a function. If $\Z$ is the set of integers, $\N^+$ is the set of natural numbers (except for zero), and $\Q$ is the set of rational numbers, then division is a binary function $f:\Z \times \N^+ \to \Q$.

In a vector space V over a field F, scalar multiplication is a binary function. A scalar a ∈ F is combined with a vector v ∈ V to produce a new vector av ∈ V.

Another example is that of inner products, or more generally functions of the form $(x,y)\mapsto x^\mathrm{T}My$, where x, y are real-valued vectors of appropriate size and M is a matrix. If M is a positive definite matrix, this yields an inner product.

== Functions of two real variables ==
Functions whose domain is a subset of $\mathbb{R}^2$ are often also called functions of two variables even if their domain does not form a rectangle and thus the cartesian product of two sets.

== Restrictions to ordinary functions ==
In turn, one can also derive ordinary functions of one variable from a binary function. Given any element $x \in X$, there is a function $f^x$, or $f(x,\cdot)$, from $Y$ to $Z$, given by $f^x(y) = f(x,y)$. Similarly, given any element $y \in Y$, there is a function $f_y$, or $f(\cdot,y)$, from $X$ to $Z$, given by $f_y(x) = f(x,y)$. In computer science, this identification between a function from $X \times Y$ to $Z$ and a function from $X$ to $Z^Y$, where $Z^Y$ is the set of all functions from $Y$ to $Z$, is called currying.

== Generalisations ==
The various concepts relating to functions can also be generalised to binary functions. For example, the division example above is surjective (or onto) because every rational number may be expressed as a quotient of an integer and a natural number. This example is injective in each input separately, because the functions f ^{x} and f _{y} are always injective. However, it's not injective in both variables simultaneously, because (for example) f (2,4) = f (1,2).

One can also consider partial binary functions, which may be defined only for certain values of the inputs. For example, the division example above may also be interpreted as a partial binary function from Z and N to Q, where N is the set of all natural numbers, including zero. But this function is undefined when the second input is zero.

A binary operation is a binary function where the sets X, Y, and Z are all equal; binary operations are often used to define algebraic structures.

In linear algebra, a bilinear transformation is a binary function where the sets X, Y, and Z are all vector spaces and the derived functions f ^{x} and f_{y} are all linear transformations. A bilinear transformation, like any binary function, can be interpreted as a function from X × Y to Z, but this function in general won't be linear. However, the bilinear transformation can also be interpreted as a single linear transformation from the tensor product $X \otimes Y$ to Z.

== Generalisations to ternary and other functions ==
The concept of binary function generalises to ternary (or 3-ary) function, quaternary (or 4-ary) function, or more generally to n-ary function for any natural number n. A 0-ary function to Z is simply given by an element of Z. One can also define an A-ary function where A is any set; there is one input for each element of A.

== Category theory ==
In category theory, n-ary functions generalise to n-ary morphisms in a multicategory. The interpretation of an n-ary morphism as an ordinary morphisms whose domain is some sort of product of the domains of the original n-ary morphism will work in a monoidal category. The construction of the derived morphisms of one variable will work in a closed monoidal category. The category of sets is closed monoidal, but so is the category of vector spaces, giving the notion of bilinear transformation above.

== See also ==
- Arity
- Unary operation
- Unary function
- Binary operation
- Iterated binary operation
- Ternary operation
