= N-category number =

In mathematics, the category number of a mathematician is a humorous construct invented by Dan Freed, intended to measure the capacity of that mathematician to stomach the use of higher categories. It is defined as the largest number n such that they can think about n-categories for a half hour without getting a splitting headache.

== See also ==
- n-category
- Erdős number
- 2-category
- Weak n-category
