= Thread automaton =

In automata theory, the thread automaton (plural: automata) is an extended type of finite-state automata that recognizes a mildly context-sensitive language class above the tree-adjoining languages.

== Formal definition ==
A thread automaton consists of

- a set N of states, (Note: called non-terminal symbols by Villemonte (2002), p.1r)
- a set Σ of terminal symbols,
- a start state A_{S} ∈ N,
- a final state A_{F} ∈ N,
- a set U of path components,
- a partial function δ: N → U^{⊥}, where U^{⊥} = U ∪ {⊥} for ⊥ ∉ U,
- a finite set Θ of transitions.

A path u_{1}...u_{n} ∈ U^{*} is a string of path components u_{i} ∈ U; n may be 0, with the empty path denoted by ε. A thread has the form u_{1}...u_{n}:A, where u_{1}...u_{n} ∈ U^{*} is a path, and A ∈ N is a state. A thread store S is a finite set of threads, viewed as a partial function from U^{*} to N, such that dom(S) is closed by prefix.

A thread automaton configuration is a triple ⟨l,p,S⟩, where l denotes the current position in the input string, p is the active thread, and S is a thread store containing p. The initial configuration is ⟨0, ε, {ε:A_{S}}⟩. The final configuration is ⟨n, u, {ε:A_{S},u:A_{F}}⟩, where n is the length of the input string and u abbreviates δ(A_{S}). A transition in the set Θ may have one of the following forms, and changes the current automaton configuration in the following way:

- SWAP B →_{a} C: consumes the input symbol a, and changes the state of the active thread:

changes the configuration from ⟨l, p, S∪{p:B}⟩ to ⟨l+1, p, S∪{p:C}⟩

- SWAP B →_{ε} C: similar, but consumes no input:

changes ⟨l, p, S∪{p:B}⟩ to ⟨l, p, S∪{p:C}⟩

- PUSH C: creates a new subthread, and suspends its parent thread:

changes ⟨l, p, S∪{p:B}⟩ to ⟨l, pu, S∪{p:B,pu:C}⟩ where u=δ(B) and pu∉dom(S)

- POP [B]C: ends the active thread, returning control to its parent:

changes ⟨l, pu, S∪{p:B,pu:C}⟩ to ⟨l, p, S∪{p:C}⟩ where δ(C)=⊥ and pu∉dom(S)

- SPUSH [C] D: resumes a suspended subthread of the active thread:

changes ⟨l, p, S∪{p:B,pu:C}⟩ to ⟨l, pu, S∪{p:B,pu:D}⟩ where u=δ(B)

- SPOP [B] D: resumes the parent of the active thread:

changes ⟨l, pu, S∪{p:B,pu:C}⟩ to ⟨l, p, S∪{p:D,pu:C}⟩ where δ(C)=⊥

One may prove that δ(B)=u for POP and SPOP transitions, and δ(C)=⊥ for SPUSH transitions.

An input string is accepted by the automaton if there is a sequence of transitions changing the initial into the final configuration.
