= N-ary associativity =

In algebra, n-ary associativity is a generalization of the associative law to n-ary operations.

A ternary operation is ternary associative if one has always

$$(abc)de=a(bcd)e=ab(cde);$$

that is, the operation gives the same result when any three adjacent elements are bracketed inside a sequence of five operands.

Similarly, an n-ary operation is n-ary associative if bracketing any n adjacent elements in a sequence of n + (n − 1) operands do not change the result.
