= N-entity =

Active n-th layer element

In telecommunications, a n-entity is an active element in the n-th layer of the Open Systems Interconnection--Reference Model (OSI-RM) that (a) interacts directly with elements, i.e., entities, of the layer immediately above or below the n-th layer, (b) is defined by a unique set of rules, i.e., syntax, and information formats, including data and control formats, and (c) performs a defined set of functions.

The n refers to any one of the 7 layers of the OSI-RM.

In an existing layered open system, the n may refer to any given layer in the system.

Layers are conventionally numbered from the lowest, i.e., the physical layer, to the highest, so that the (n + 1)-th layer is above the n-th layer and the (n − 1)-th layer is below.
