= Constant (mathematics) =

Function or value which does not change

In mathematics, the word constant conveys multiple meanings. As an adjective, it refers to non-variance (i.e. unchanging with respect to some other value); as a noun, it has two different meanings:

- A fixed and well-defined number or other non-changing mathematical object, or the symbol denoting it. The terms mathematical constant or physical constant are sometimes used to distinguish this meaning.
- A function whose value remains unchanged (i.e., a constant function). Such a constant is commonly represented by a variable which does not depend on the main variable(s) in question.

For example, a general quadratic function is commonly written as $a x^2 + b x + c$, where a, b, and c are constants (coefficients or parameters), and x a variable—a placeholder for the argument of the function being studied. A more explicit way to denote this function is $x\mapsto a x^2 + b x + c$, which makes the function-argument status of x (and by extension the constancy of a, b, and c) clear. In this example a, b, and c are coefficients of the polynomial. Since c occurs in a term that does not involve x, it is called the constant term of the polynomial and can be thought of as the coefficient of x^{0}. More generally, any polynomial term or expression of degree zero (no variable) is a constant.

== Constant function ==
A constant may be used to define a constant function that ignores its arguments and always gives the same value. A constant function of a single variable, such as $f(x)=5$, has a graph of a horizontal line parallel to the x-axis. Such a function always takes the same value (in this case 5), because the variable does not appear in the expression defining the function.

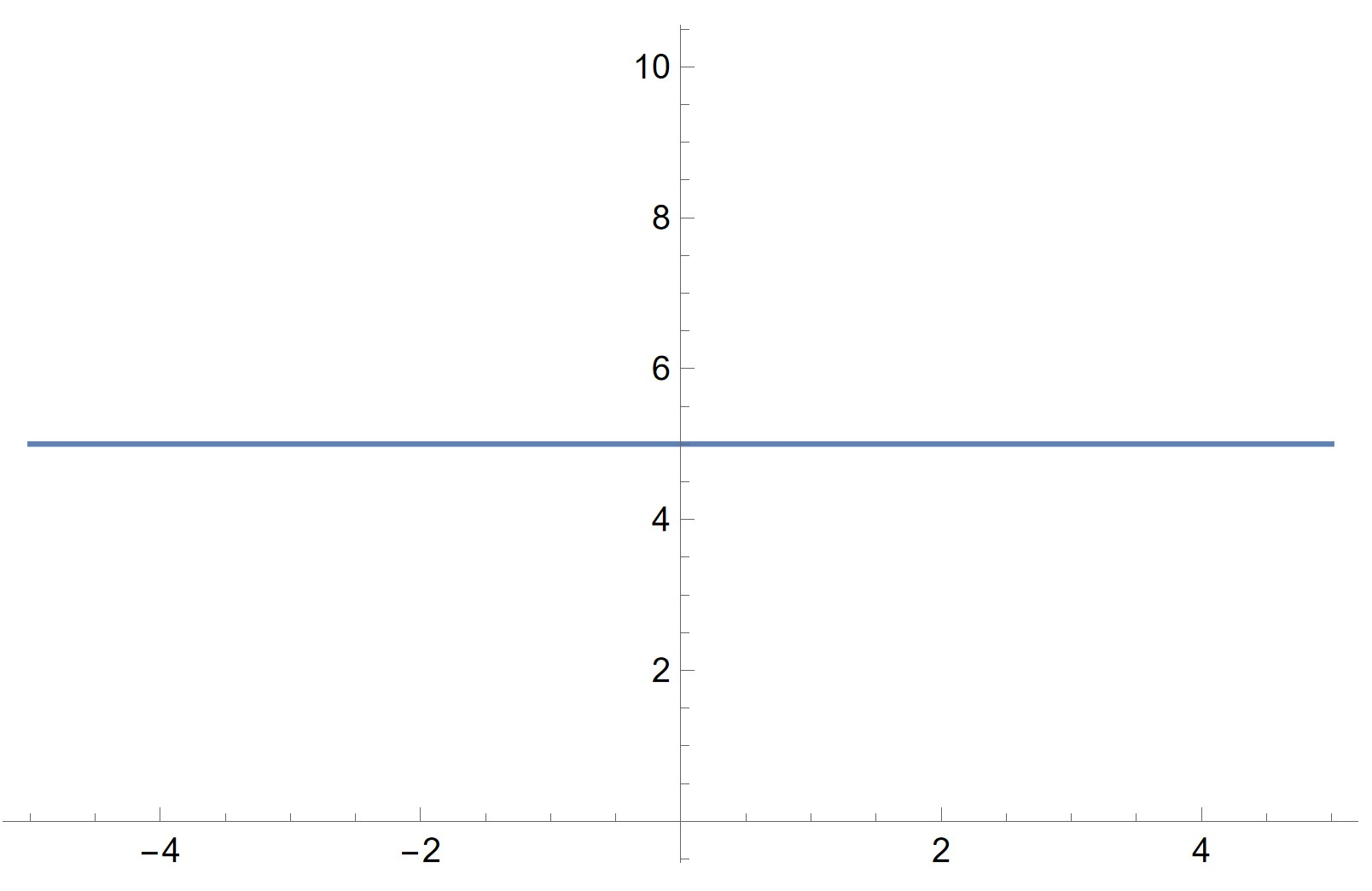
Graph of $f(x) = 5$.

== Context-dependence ==
The context-dependent nature of the concept of "constant" can be seen in this example from elementary calculus:

$$\begin{align}
\frac{d}{dx} 2^x  & = \lim_{h\to 0} \frac{2^{x+h} - 2^x} h = \lim_{h\to 0} 2^x\frac{2^h - 1} h \\[8pt]
& = 2^x \lim_{h\to 0} \frac{2^h - 1} h & & \text{since } x \text{ is constant (i.e. does not depend on } h\text{)} \\[8pt]
& = 2^x \cdot\mathbf{constant,} & & \text{where }\mathbf{constant}\text{ means not depending on } x.
\end{align}$$
"Constant" means not depending on some variable; not changing as that variable changes. In the first case above, it means not depending on h; in the second, it means not depending on x. A constant in a narrower context could be regarded as a variable in a broader context.

== Notable mathematical constants ==
Some values occur frequently in mathematics and are conventionally denoted by a specific symbol. These standard symbols and their values are called mathematical constants. Examples include:

- 0 (zero).
- 1 (one), the natural number after zero.
- π (pi), the constant representing the ratio of a circle's circumference to its diameter, approximately equal to 3.142.
- e, approximately equal to 2.718.
- i, the imaginary unit such that i^{2} = −1.
- $\sqrt{2}$ (square root of 2), the length of the diagonal of a square with unit sides, approximately equal to 1.414.
- φ (golden ratio), approximately equal to 1.618, or algebraically, $1+ \sqrt{5} \over 2$.

== Constants in calculus ==
In calculus, constants are treated in several different ways depending on the operation. For example, the derivative (rate of change) of a constant function is zero. This is because constants, by definition, do not change. Their derivative is hence zero.

Conversely, when integrating a constant function, the constant is multiplied by the variable of integration.

During the evaluation of a limit, a constant remains the same as it was before and after evaluation.

Integration of a function of one variable often involves a constant of integration. This arises because the integral is the inverse (opposite) of the derivative meaning that the aim of integration is to recover the original function before differentiation. The derivative of a constant function is zero, as noted above, and the differential operator is a linear operator, so functions that only differ by a constant term have the same derivative. To acknowledge this, a constant of integration is added to an indefinite integral; this ensures that all possible solutions are included. The constant of integration is generally written as 'c', and represents a constant with a fixed but undefined value.

=== Examples ===
If f is the constant function such that $f(x) = 72$ for every x then
$$\begin{align}
f'(x) &= 0 \\
\int f(x) \,dx &= 72x + c\\
\lim_{x\rarr0}f(x)&=72
\end{align}$$

== See also ==
- Expression (mathematics)
- Level set
- Physical constant
