= Semigroup Forum =

- Discipline: Mathematics
- Language: English, French, German, Russian

Publication details
- Publisher: Springer

Standard abbreviations
- ISO 4: Semigr. Forum
- MathSciNet: Semigroup Forum

Indexing
- ISSN: 0037-1912 (print); 1432-2137 (web)

Links
- Journal homepage

Semigroup Forum (print ISSN 0037-1912, electronic ISSN 1432-2137) is a mathematics research journal published by Springer. The journal serves as a platform for research in semigroup theory. Coverage in the journal includes:

- algebraic semigroups,
- topological semigroups,
- partially ordered semigroups,
- semigroups of measures and harmonic analysis on semigroups,
- transformation semigroups, and
- applications of semigroup theory to other disciplines such as ring theory, category theory, automata, and logic.

Semigroups of operators were initially considered off-topic, but began being included in the journal in 1985.

== Contents ==
Semigroup Forum features survey and research articles. It also contains research announcements, which describe new results, mostly without proofs, of full length papers appearing elsewhere as well as short notes, which detail such information as new proofs, significant generalizations of known facts, comments on unsolved problems, and historical remarks. In addition, the journal contains research problems; announcements of conferences, seminars, and symposia on semigroup theory; abstracts and bibliographical items; as well as listings of books, papers, and lecture notes of interest.

== History ==
The journal published its first issue in 1970. It is indexed in Science Citation Index Expanded, Journal Citation Reports/Science Edition, SCOPUS, and Zentralblatt Math.

"Semigroup Forum was a pioneering journal ... one of the early instances of a highly specialized journal, of which there are now many. Indeed, it was during the 1960s that many of the current specialised journals began to appear, probably in connection with research specialization ...among many other examples, the journals Topology, Journal of Algebra, Journal of Combinatorial Theory, and Journal of Number Theory were launched in 1962, 1964, 1966 and 1969 respectively. Semigroup Forum simply followed in this trend, with academic publishers realizing that there was a market for such narrowly focused journals.

This journal has been called "in many ways a point of crystallization for semigroup theory and its community", and "an indicator of a field which is mathematically active".
