= N-ary code =

In telecommunications, an n-ary code is a code that has n significant conditions, where n is a positive integer greater than 1. The integer substituted for n indicates the specific number of significant conditions, i.e., quantization states, in the code. For example, an 8-ary code has eight significant conditions and can convey three bits per code symbol. A prefix that indicates an integer, e.g., "bin", "tern," or "quatern", may be used in lieu of a numeral, to produce "binary", "ternary", or "quaternary" (2, 3, and 4 states respectively).

== See also ==
- Arity
