= Binary operation =

Mathematical operation with two operands

A binary operation $\circ$ is a rule for combining the arguments $x$ and $y$ to produce $x\circ y$

In mathematics, a binary operation or dyadic operation is a kind of binary function, i.e. given a pair of input values (called operands), it produces an output value. For example, addition is a binary operation: $3 + 4 = 7$. A binary operation is an operation of arity two.

Some definitions require the two inputs and the output to be elements of the same set.

Binary operations are usually written using infix notation such as $a \star b$ rather than by functional notation of the form $f(a, b)$. Multiplication and exponentiation are frequently written without operator, but with exponents as superscript.

In abstract algebra, a binary operation on a set $S$ is a mapping of the elements of the Cartesian product $S \times S$ to $S$:
$$\,f \colon S \times S \rightarrow S.$$

If the mapping is total, $(S, f)$ is a magma. However, if $f$ is a partial mapping, then $f$ is a partial binary operation, which can be one of the operations in a partial algebra on $S$, such as the partial groupoid $(S, f)$.

A binary operation $f$ on a set $S$ may be viewed as a ternary relation on $S$, that is, the set of triples $(a, b, f(a,b))$ in $S \times S \times S$ for all $a$ and $b$ in $S$.

Binary operations are the keystone of most structures that are studied in algebra, in particular in semigroups, monoids, groups, rings, fields, and vector spaces.

== Examples ==
Arithmetic operations like addition ($a + b$), subtraction ($a - b$), and multiplication ($a \times b$ or, using juxtaposition, $ab$) are binary operations on numbers. Division ($a / b$ or $a \div b$) is only a partial binary operation on the set of rational numbers and the set of real numbers, because division by zero is undefined, but a (total) binary operation on the set of positive real numbers.

Union ($X \cup Y$), intersection ($X \cap Y$), and set difference ($X \backslash Y$) are binary operations on sets. There are 16 binary operations on binary variables, such as 'AND', 'OR', and 'XOR'.

If a broad definition of "binary operation" is used, such that the inputs and output do not have to be from the same set, then scalar multiplication ($a \vec{v}$) is an binary operator from a scalar and a vector to a vector, and dot product ($\vec{u} \cdot \vec{v}$) is a binary operator from two vectors to a scalar.

Function composition ($g \circ h$) is a binary operation on compatible functions.

== Properties ==
Ways to classify binary operations include:

- The commutative property: $a \star b = b \star a$
- The associative property: $(a \star b) \star c = a \star (b \star c)$
- Having an identity element $e$: $a \star e = a = e \star a$
  - Each element of $S$ having an inverse element: $a^{-1} \star a = e = a \star a^{-1}$

== See also ==
- Iterated binary operation: repeated application of a binary operation to reduce a collection of values to a single combined value
- Operator (computer programming): a construct in computing that often represents a binary operation
- Unary operation: an operation with arity one
- Ternary operation: an operation with arity three
