= List of honorary graduates of the University of Exeter =

Key
DDiv	Doctor of Divinity
DEng	Doctor of Engineering
LLD	Doctor of Laws
DLitt	Doctor of Letters
DM	Doctor of Medicine
DMus	Doctor of Music
DSc	Doctor of Science
MA	Master of Arts
MSc	Master of Science

This list of Honorary Graduates of the University of Exeter is a year-by-year list of people recognized by the University of Exeter for their achievements in their given field with an honorary award.

An honorary degree or a degree honoris causa (Latin: 'for the sake of the honour') is an academic degree for which a university (or other degree-awarding institution) has waived the usual requirements (such as matriculation, residence, study and the passing of examinations). The degree itself is typically a doctorate or, less commonly, a master's degree, and may be awarded to someone who has no prior connection with the academic institution.

== 2020s ==
2024

- Art Rooney II (LLD)
- General Sir Patrick Sanders (LLD)
- Josh Widdicombe (DLitt)
- Will Young (DLitt)

2023

- Melanie Eusebe (LLD)
- Bernardine Evaristo (DLitt)
- Leslie McLoughlin (DLitt)
- Georgina Radford (DSc)
- Melinda Simmons (LLD)
- Steve Smith (LLD)
- Nicholas Tregenza (DSc)

2022

- Dolly Alderton (DLitt)
- Dina Asher-Smith (LLD)
- Andrew Brownsword (LLD)
- Zrinka Bralo (DLitt)
- Nicholas Bull (LLD)
- Jocelyn Bell Burnell (DSc)
- Margaret Busby (DLitt)
- John Curtice (LLD)
- Lyse Doucet (DLitt)
- Carrie Gracie (DLitt)
- Krishnan Guru-Murthy (DLitt)
- Isabel Hardman (DLitt)
- Sue Hill (DSc)
- André & Rosalie Hoffmann (DSc)
- Mark Ormrod (LLD)
- Emily Penn (DSc)
- Shaun Sawyer (LLD)
- Hans Joachim Schellnhuber (DSc)
- Kamila Shamsie (DLitt)
- Patrick Swaffer (DLitt)
- Michael Ebenezer Kwadjo Omari Owuo Junior (Stormzy) (DLitt)

2021

- Mark Hannaford (DSc)

2020

- Anastasios Paul Leventis (LLD)

== 2010s ==
2019

- Chunli Bai (DSc)
- Kate Lampard (LLD)
- Teresa Gleadowe (DLitt)
- Moira Marder (LLD)
- Reni Eddo-Lodge (DLitt)
- Richard Hughes (LLD)
- Roderick MacSween (DLitt)
- Karime Hassan (LLD)
- Hugo Tagholm (DSc)
- Sarah Mullally (DDiv)
- Professor Joseph Sung (DSc)
- Elena Becker-Barroso (DSc)
- Dame Mary Beard (DLitt)
- Gordon Marshall (LLD)
- Howard Fillit (DSc)
- Eliud Kipchoge (LLD)

2018

- Ruth Hunt (LLD)
- John Simpson (DLitt)
- Simon Timson (DSc)
- Sir John Savill (DSc)
- Sir Simon Charles Wessely (DSc)
- Alan Johnson (LLD)
- Felix Barrett (DLitt)
- Sir Robin Nicholson (DSc)
- Raymond J. St. Leger (DSc)
- Robert Crum (DLitt)
- Natasha Trethewey (DLitt)
- Barbara Vann (DSc)
- Laura Penhaul (LLD)
- Andrew Garrad (DEng)
- Adama Dieng (LLD)
- Neil Woodford (LLD)
- Jeremy Hughes (DSc)

2017

- Lieutenant Colonel Lucy Giles (LLD)
- Jeremy "Jez" Butterworth (DLitt)
- Alex Farquharson (DLitt)
- Lindsey Hilsum (DLitt)
- Sir Donald Cullin (DLitt)
- Lady Studholme (DLitt)
- Philip Collins (DLitt)
- Tony Sewell (LLD)
- Rob Baxter (LLD)
- Jonathan Adams (DSc)
- Mireille Gillings (DSc)
- Bertil Andersson (DSc)
- Peter Lacey (LLD)
- Helen Brand (LLD)
- Hilary Evans (DSc)
- Ian L. Boyd (DSc)
- Augustin Hadelich (DMus)
- David Neuberger, Baron Neuberger of Abbotsbury (LLD)

2016

- Clare Marx (DSc)
- Sir Robert Francis (LLD)
- Jeremy Paxman (DLitt)
- Camilla Hampshire (LLD)
- John Pullinger (LLD)
- Paul Johnson (LLD)
- Gillian Tett (DLitt)
- Dr Christine Loh Kung-wai (DSc)
- Paul Polman (LLD)
- Edward Barry Farwell (LLD)
- Sally Gunnell (LLD)
- Richard W. Michelmore (DSc)

2015

- Glynis Atherton (LLD)
- Andrew Adonis, Baron Adonis (LLD)
- Sir John Goldring (LLD)
- Ralph Wilcox (LLD)
- Joanne Pavey (LLD)
- MandyBain (LLD)
- Richard Atkins (LLD)
- Sir Andrew Witty (LLD)
- Alvin Roth (LLD)
- Graham Cole (LLD)
- Dame Alison Carnwath (LLD)
- Trevor Phillips (DLitt)
- Abi Morgan (DLitt)
- Steve Field (DSc)
- Dame Anne Glover (DSc)
- Dame Julia King (DSc)
- Sir John Bell (DSc)
- Stephen T. Holgate (DSc)

2014

- Wol Kolade (LLD)
- Teresa Rees (LLD)
- Tony Rowe (LLD)
- Roy PikeA (LLD)
- Sigrid Kaag (LLD)
- Doreen Lawrence, Baroness Lawrence of Clarendon (LLD)
- Karan Bilimoria, Baron Bilimoria (LLD)
- Kanya King (LLD)
- Tim Hollingsworth (LLD)
- Carl Gilleard (LLD)
- Philip Bostock (LLD)
- Mike Leigh (DLitt)
- Thomas Trevor (DLitt)
- Sir Mark Walport (DSc)
- Dame Julia Slingo (DSc)

2013

- James Jones (DDiv)
- Alexandra Jellicoe (DEng)
- Elizabeth Earland (LLD)
- Ashley Tabor (LLD)
- Ambassador Barry Desker (LLD)
- Sir Brian Burridge (LLD)
- Russell Seal (LLD)
- Steve Perryman (LLD)
- David Allen (LLD)
- Timothy C. Niblock (LLD)
- Alexander Beleschenko (DLitt)
- Leo Hickman (DLitt)

2012

- Iain Gray (DEng)
- Stephen Edge (LLD)
- Barry Bateman (LLD)
- Judge Demetrios Hadjihambis (LLD)
- Helena Kennedy, Baroness Kennedy of The Shaws (LLD)
- Alan Milburn (LLD)
- Bryn Parry (LLD)
- Emma Parry (LLD)
- Sir Michael Pownall (LLD)
- Steve Backshall (DLitt)
- Nik Gowing (DLitt)
- Armando Iannucci (DLitt)
- Cynthia Carroll (DSc)
- Dame Athene Donald (DSc)
- Russell Hamilton (DSc)
- John Hirst (DSc)

2011

- Si-Chen Lee (DEng)
- Steve Hindley (DEng)
- Sir Peter Lampl (LLD)
- Harriet Lamb (LLD)
- Barbara Frost (LLD)
- Les Halpin (LLD)
- Angela Pedder (LLD)
- Dato Ambiga Sreenevasan (LLD)
- Jim French (LLD)
- Dame Hilary Mantel (DLitt)
- Neil Canning (DLitt)
- Andrew D. Hamilton (DSc)
- Dennis Gillings (DSc)
- Sir Peter Rubin (DSc)

2010

- Sheikha Lubna bint Khalid Al Qasimi (LLD)
- Dame Julia Cleverdon (LLD)
- Sir John Rose (LLD)
- Sir Eric Dancer (LLD)
- Sir Richard Lambert (LLD)
- Sir Ian Botham (LLD)
- Barbara Young, Baroness Young of Old Scone (LLD)
- Shami Chakrabarti (LLD)
- Deborah Meaden (LLD)
- Jane Knight (LLD)
- Fiona Shackleton, Baroness Shackleton of Belgravia (LLD)
- Sharron Davies (LLD)
- Baroness Sue Campbell, Baroness Campbell of Loughborough (LLD)
- Philip Pullman (DLitt)
- Elaine Goodwin (DLitt)
- Peter Randall-Page (DLitt)
- Kuljit Bhamra (DMus)
- Dame Sally Claire Davies (DSc)
- Lady Ann Redgrave (DSc)
- Dame Alison Richard (DSc)

== 2000s ==
2009

- Bill Ind (DDiv)
- Clive Lee (DEng)
- Christopher Mullard (LLD)
- Clive Stafford Smith (LLD)
- Richard Ward (LLD)
- Sir Ian Carruthers (LLD)
- Satish Kumar (LLD)
- Sir Michael Barber (LLD)
- Gerald Sturtridge (LLD)
- Don Boyd (DLitt)
- Karen Armstrong (DLitt)
- Sir Leszek Borysiewicz (DSc)
- Sir Denis Pereira Gray (DSc)
- R. S. M. Ling (DSc)

2008

- Sarah Buck (DEng)
- Sheikh Ahmed Zaki Yamani (LLD)
- Sir Martin Harris (LLD)
- Mark Thompson (LLD)
- Ian Henderson (LLD)
- Sir David Brewer (LLD)
- Jonathan Dimbleby (LLD)
- Dame Mary Keegan (LLD)
- Sir Robin Knox-Johnston (LLD)
- Ruth Hawker (LLD)
- Olga Polizzi (LLD)
- Jonathon Porritt (LLD)
- Amartya Sen (LLD)
- Ahdaf Soueif (DLitt)
- Rik Mayall (DLitt)
- Ken Follett (DLitt)
- Sir David Attenborough (DSc)

2007

- Michael Langrish (DDiv)
- Frank Gardner (LLD)
- Ekmeleddin Ihsanoğlu (LLD)
- Yusuf Islam (LLD)
- Anthony Gibson (LLD)
- Sir Robert Owen (LLD)
- Sir Peter Job (LLD)
- Sir Richard Dearlove (LLD)
- Ray Dillon (LLD)
- Sir Clive Woodward (LLD)
- Richard Hooper (LLD)
- Peter Lord (LLD)
- David Sproxton (LLD)
- Adrian Edmondson (DLitt)
- Jennifer Saunders (DLitt)
- David Eldridge (DLitt)
- Beverley Naidoo (DLitt)
- Michael Rosen (DLitt)
- Posy Simmonds (DLitt)
- Kurt Jackson (DLitt)
- Brian May (DSc)
- Nicholas Stern, Baron Stern of Brentford (DSc)
- Dame Carol Black (DSc)
- Martin Rees, Lord Rees of Ludlow (DSc)

2006

- Sue Barker (LLD)
- Princess Maha Chakri Sirindhorn (LLD)
- Roderick Ross (LLD)
- Sir Anthony Clarke (LLD)
- Alan Cotton (DLitt)
- Peter Ewins (DSc)
- Sir John Beringer (DSc)
- William Wakeham (DSc)

2005

- Jane Henderson (LLD)
- Abdullah Gül (LLD)
- Ben Ainslie (LLD)
- John Allwood (LLD)
- Sir Tom Shebbeare (LLD)
- Admiral Sir Jonathon Band (LLD)
- Usha Prashar, Baroness Prashar (LLD)
- Tony Robinson (LLD)
- Stewart Purvis (LLD)
- Jonathan Edwards (LLD)
- Floella Benjamin (DLitt)
- Jane Lapotaire (DLitt)
- Benjamin Zephaniah (DLitt)
- Sir Peter Mansfield (DSc)
- Michael Fish (DSc)

2004

- Sir Ewen Cameron, Baron Cameron of Dillington (LLD)
- Irene Bishop (LLD)
- Ian Powell (LLD)
- Pola Uddin, Baroness Uddin (LLD)
- Lord Justice Sedley (LLD)
- Pen Hadow (LLD)
- Michael Caines (LLD)
- Paul Jackson (DLitt)
- Ben Okri (DLitt)
- Michael Morpurgo (DLitt)
- Barbara Jefford (DLitt)
- Dame Julia Higgins (DSc)
- Robert Winston, Lord Winston (DSc)

2003

- Sir Geoffrey Holland (LLD)
- Tanni Grey-Thompson (LLD)
- Dame Suzi Leather (LLD)
- Paul Myners (LLD)
- Anthony Salz (LLD)
- Richard Wilson, Baron Wilson of Dinton (LLD)
- Simon Jenkins (DLitt)
- Sir Christopher Ondaatje (DLitt)
- Sir Antony Sher (DLitt)
- Jatinder Verma (DLitt)
- Richard Case (DSc)
- Sir Christopher Evans (DSc)
- Sir John Sulston (DSc)

2002

- Ann Daniels (LLD)
- Norman Hardyman(LLD)
- Bridget Kendall (LLD)
- Christopher Patten (LLD)
- Marjorie Scardino (LLD)
- Sir David Walker (LLD)
- Harry Woolf, Baron Woolf (LLD)
- Angela Yeoman (LLD)
- Prince Waleed bin Talal Al Saud (LLD)
- Sir Tim Rice (DLitt)
- Rick Stein (DLitt)
- George Gray (DSc)
- Timothy Hunt (DSc)

2001

- Rowan Williams (DDiv)
- Queen Rania Al-Abdullah (LLD)
- Sir Peter Davis (LLD)
- Mr Justice Elias (LLD)
- Timothy Smit (LLD)
- Bridget Towle (LLD)
- Mohammed Arkoun (DLitt)
- Wilhelmina Barns-Graham (DLitt)
- Helen Dunmore (DLitt)
- Susan Hampshire (DLitt)
- Seamus Heaney (DLitt)
- Edward Said (DLitt)
- George Weidenfeld, Baron Weidenfeld (DLitt)
- Christopher Bruce (DLitt)
- Dame Gillian Weir (DMus)
- Sir Harold Kroto (DSc)
- Jane Plant (DSc)
- Dame Lesley Southgate (DSc)

2000

- Bartholomew I (LLD)
- Sally Greengross, Baroness Greengross (LLD)
- Margaret Lorenz (LLD)
- Peter Sutherland (LLD)
- Joanne K. Rowling (DLitt)
- Sir Nicholas Serota (DLitt)
- Evelyn Glennie (DMus)
- Edward W. Abel (DSc)
- Per-Olaf Astrand (DSc)
- Sir Ghillean Prance (DSc)
- Sir John Taylor (DSc)

== 1990s ==
1999

- Cardinal Cahal Brendan Daly (DDiv)
- Lord Eames (DDiv)
- Baroness Brenda Dean (LLD)
- Charles Handy (LLD)
- Christopher Moon (LLD)
- Sir Terry Frost (DLitt)
- Edward Mortimer (DLitt)
- Andrew Motion (DLitt)
- Adrian Noble (DLitt)
- Imogen Cooper (DMus)
- Susan Greenfield (DSc)
- Dame Bridget Ogilvie (DSc)
- Helen Sharman (DSc)
- Sir Crispin Tickell (DSc)
- David Warren Turner (DSc)
- Sir David Weatherall (DSc)

1998

- David Sheppard (DDiv)
- Desmond Tutu (DDiv)
- Noel Warner (DEng)
- Robin Butler, Baron Butler of Brockwell (LLD)
- Ronald Dearing, Baron Dearing (LLD)
- Michael Nolan, Baron Nolan (LLD)
- Lord Justice Phillips (LLD)
- Tadeusz Mazowiecki (LLD)
- Jacob Rothschild, 4th Baron Rothschild (LLD)
- Robert Neil MacGregor (DLitt)
- Alfred Brendel Hon. (DMus)
- John Krebs (DSc)
- Dato' Mohamad Idris Mansor (DSc)

1997

- Sir Edward George (LLD)
- Sir David Tweedie (LLD)
- Lady Mary Holborow (LLD)
- Brian Rix, Lord Rix (LLD)
- Joyce Youings (DLitt)
- Bridget Riley (DLitt)
- Hugh Allen (DSc)
- Sir Donald Irvine (DSc)

1996

- Sir David Calcutt (LLD)
- Peter Chalk (LLD)
- Dame Stella Rimington (LLD)
- Sir Stephen Tumim (LLD)
- Sir Alan Bowness (DLitt)
- Sir William Stubbs (DLitt)
- T. R. P. Brighouse (DLitt)
- Richard L. Gregory (DSc)
- Samuel E. Jonah (DSc)
- Sir Maurice Laing (DSc)
- Sir Michael Peckham (DSc)

1995

- Robert Alexander, Baron Alexander of Weedon (LLD)
- Nigel Beale (LLD)
- Zoltan P. Dienes (LLD)
- Lord Morley (LLD)
- Mary Douglas (DLitt)
- Marina Warner (DLitt)
- Sir David Harrison (DSc)
- Sir John Knill (DSc)
- Elizabeth J. Yerxa (DSc)

1994

- Trevor Huddleston (DDiv)
- Ian Mercer (LLD)
- David Owen, Lord Owen (LLD)
- Robert Pennington (LLD)
- Lieutenant General Sir Stewart Pringle (LLD)
- Sir George Christie (DLitt)
- Clive Gronow (DSc)
- Andrew Lang (DSc)
- John Polkinghorne (DSc)

1993

- Robert P. Cohan (DLitt)
- Michael Screech (DLitt)
- Mary Wesley (DLitt)
- Sheikh Sultan bin Muhammad Al-Qasimi (DLitt)
- Sándor Végh (DMus)
- Sir John Banham (DSc)
- Sir John Cullen (DSc)
- David Rees (DSc)
- Robert Wilson (DSc)

1992

- Dame Elizabeth Butler-Sloss, Baroness Butler-Sloss (LLD)
- James Hetherington (LLD)
- Christopher Pope TD (LLD)
- R. K. L. Hill (LLD)
- Peter Ackroyd (DLitt)
- Sir Anthony Parsons (DLitt)
- Frank Harary (DSc)
- F. Gordon A. Stone (DSc)

1991

- Canon John Thurmer (DDiv)
- Sir Richard Acland (LLD)
- Sydney Templeman, Baron Templeman (LLD)
- Gerald Aylmer (DLitt)
- Lionel Dakers (DMus)
- Michael Berry (DSc)
- Sheila Cassidy (DSc)
- Aleksandr Nikolaevich Yakovlev (DSc)

1990

- Michael Foot (LLD)
- Sir Brinsley Ford (LLD)
- Eurfron Gwynne Jones (LLD)
- Halfdan Mahler (LLD) (DLitt)
- Jean-François Botrel (DLitt)
- David Cornwell (DLitt)
- Joaquin Rodrigo (DMus)
- Peter Bradshaw (DSc)
- Lady Anne Brewis (DSc)
- Dame Margaret Turner-Warwick (DSc)

== 1980s ==
1989

- Sir Nicholas Goodison (LLD)
- Sir John Smith (LLD)
- Baroness Seear (LLD)
- Sylvia Kantaris (DLitt)
- Wayne Sleep (DLitt)
- John Edgar Stevens (DMus)
- Brother Adam (DSc)
- Sir John Quicke (DSc)
- Sir John Harvey-Jones (DSc)

1988

- Sir Antony Acland (LLD)
- W. G. Daw (LLD)
- J. L. Smeall (LLD)
- Glenda Jackson (DLitt)
- Dame Elisabeth Frink (DLitt)
- F. W. Walbank (DLitt)
- Daphne Jackson (DSc)
- J. E. Lovelock (DSc)
- F. J. M. Laver (DSc)

1987

- Frank Gillard (LLD)
- C. D. Pike (LLD)
- Baroness Warnock (DLitt)
- Richard Stanton-Jones (DSc)
- Abdus Salam (DSc)
- D. R. Barber (MSc)

1986

- Sir Robin Day (LLD)
- Kenneth Rowe (LLD)
- John Mortimer (LLD)
- Fred L Harris (DLitt)
- Vivian Richards (DLitt)
- Ewan MacColl (DLitt)
- Jane Glover (DMus)
- Sir David Smith (DSc)

1985

- Sir Gordon Slynn (LLD)
- Sir Michael Hordern (DLitt)
- Aileen, Lady Fox (DLitt)
- Sir John Gray (DSc)
- Sir Austin Pearce (DSc)
- Harry Kay (DSc)

1984

- Sheila Browne (LLD)
- Justice Park (LLD)
- William Trevor (DLitt)
- R. Aris (DSc)
- K. Ellitsgaard Rasmussen (DSc)
- Sir Alan Harris (DSc)
- Gene Kemp (MA)

1983

- Sir Jean-Pierre Warner (LLD)
- Hugh Greenwood (LLD)
- John Fowles (DLitt)
- F. J. Fisher (DLitt)
- B. D. Josephson (DSc)

1982

- Michael Young, Baron Young of Dartington (LLD)
- Sir Alan Dalton (LLD)
- M. G. Brock (DLitt)
- Patrick Heron (DLitt)
- Ted Hughes (DLitt)
- Sir John Kendrew (DSc)
- Sir David Phillips (DSc)
- L. L. Iversen (DSc)
- Jean Boxall (MA)

1981

- R. J. S. Hookway (LLD)
- Sir Kelvin Spencer (LLD)
- Frank Barlow (DLitt)
- Jack Clemo (DLitt)
- Robert Niklaus (DLitt)
- P. G. Burke (DSc)
- W. K. Hayman (DSc)
- H. N. Rydon (DSc)
- A. G. Crouch (MSc)

1980

- Alan Lennox-Boyd, 1st Viscount Boyd of Merton (LLD)
- Sir John Palmer (LLD)
- R. W. Turner (LLD)
- Baroness Ryder of Warsaw (LLD)
- Benjamin Luxon (DMus)
- Sir Edward Abraham (DSc)
- Stella M. Turk (MSc)

== 1970s ==
1979

- J. C. Alderson (LLD)
- Colonel Sir John Carew Pole, 12th Baronet (LLD)
- Christopher Hill (DLitt)
- John Richard Lill (DMus)
- G. Higman (DSc)
- Mollie Clarke (MA)

1978

- Lord Mackenzie Stuart (LLD)
- Kingman Brewster (LLD)
- Alfred K. Hamilton Jenkin (DLitt)
- G. C. Ainsworth (DSc)
- R. J. Keast (MA)

1977

- General Sir John Hackett (LLD)
- H. B. Garland (DLitt)
- Charles S. Causley (DLitt)
- Robert Oxton Bolt (DLitt)
- Antony Hewish (DSc)
- P. D. Mitchell (DSc)

1976

- Tom Denning, Baron Denning (LLD)
- R. C. Tress (LLD)
- Sir David Willcocks (DMus)
- Sir Eric Denton (DSc)
- Constance R. Henson (MA)

1975

- Robert Lecourt (LLD)
- P. J. V. D. Balsdon (DLitt)
- René Marache (DLitt)
- Michael Oakeshott (DLitt)
- Sir Kingsley Dunham (DSc)
- Sir Rex Richards (DSc)

1974

- Colonel J. E. Palmer (LLD)
- Jeremy Thorpe (LLD)
- David Douglas (DLitt)
- W. G. Hoskins (DLitt)
- Dame L. H. N. Cooper (DSc)
- H. M. Stanley (DSc)
- Sir Rodney Smith (DSc)
- Vera Lloyd (MA)

1973

- Canon G. R. Dunstan (DDiv)
- Marcus Knight (LLD)
- Sir John Llewellyn (LLD)
- C. A. Ralegh Radford (DLitt)
- Air Commodore Sir Frank Whittle (DSc)
- Norman Lyne (MA)

1972

- Dr Margaret Jackson (LLD)
- Judge Pratt (LLD)
- L. K. Elmhirst (DLitt)
- Sir Raymond Firth (DLitt)
- C. T. Ingold (DSc)
- Andrew Stratton (DSc)

1971

- W. A. E. Westall (DDiv)
- Sir Jack Hayward (LLD)
- John Widgery, Baron Widgery, TD (LLD)
- Sir John Betjeman (DLitt)
- Dame Frances Yates (DLitt)
- Sir Frederick Dainton (DSc)
- J. A. Church (MA)

1970

- Sir Kenneth Wheare (LLD)
- G. E. Fussell (DLitt)
- Canon J. B. Phillips (DLitt)
- Malcolm Arnold (DMus)
- P. H. Kuenen (DSc)
- Sir Hugh Tett (DSc)

== 1960s ==
1969

- H. Freville (LLD)
- Massey Lopes, 2nd Baron Roborough (LLD)
- J. Whiteside (LLD)
- Sir Alexander Cairncross (LLD)
- Imogen Holst (DLitt)
- H. L. Beales (DLitt)
- Dame Kathleen Kenyon (DLitt)
- B. F. Skinner (DSc)
- Sir Eric Eastwood (DSc)
- Sir Peter Medawar (DSc)

1968

- Hugh Foot, Baron Caradon (LLD)
- A. S. Neill (LLD)
- Sir Martin Davies (DLitt)
- V. H. Galbraith (DLitt)
- William Holford, Baron Holford (DLitt)
- G. Wilson Knight (DLitt)
- D. C. Hodgkin (DSc)
- Sir Eric Smith (DSc)
- E. A. Paddon (MA)
- L. M. Tate (MSc)

1967

- Sir James Cook (LLD)

1966

- Henri Le Moal (LLD)
- Sir Leslie Scarman (LLD)
- Cleanth Brooks (DLitt)
- Sir Frank Francis (DLitt)
- Dame Barbara Hepworth (DLitt)
- Patrick Blackett, Lord Blackett (DSc)
- William Keble Martin (DSc)
- Margaret Digby (MA)

1965

- Sir George Hayter-Hames (LLD)
- Field Marshal Sir Richard Hull (LLD)
- Marcel Bataillon (DLitt)
- Herbert Dieckmann (DLitt)
- Cecil Day-Lewis (DLitt)
- Sir Dudley Stamp (DSc)
- Sir Patrick Linstead (DSc)
- Gerald Whitmarsh (MA)

1964

None

1963

- Dorothy Whitney Elmhirst (LLD)
- Laurence Helsby, Baron Helsby (LLD)
- Sir Peter Scott (LLD)
- Sir Henry Slesser (LLD)
- Sydney Chapman (DSc)
- Professor A. V. Hill (DSc)

1962

- A. P. Steele-Perkins (LLD)

1961

- Theodor Heuss (LLD)
- Sir Paul Sinker (LLD)
- Bernard Leach (DLitt)
- Agatha Christie (DLitt)
- Sir William Hodge (DSc)

1960

- C. J. Fuller (LLD)
- B. G. Lampard-Vachell (LLD)
- Sir David Hughes Parry (LLD)
- Carl Dolmetsch (DLitt)
- Lionel Robbins, Lord Robbins (DLitt)
- A. L. Rowse (DLitt)
- Enid Starkie (DLitt)
- Sir Frederick Russell (DSc)
- Alexander Todd, Lord Todd (DSc)

== 1950s ==
1959

- Sayed Mekki Abbas (LLD)
- Derick Heathcoat-Amory, 1st Viscount Amory (LLD)
- Sir Arthur Reed (LLD)
- John Hay Whitney (LLD)
- Colonel Sidney John Worsley TD (LLD)
- Nancy Astor, Viscountess Astor (LLD)
- Isaac Foot (DLitt)
- Paul Henry (DLitt)
- Ernest Newman (DLitt)
- Sir Harry Melville (DSc)

1958

None

1957

- Sir John Daw (LLD)
- E. Vincent Harris (LLD)
- W. H. Lewis (LLD)
- A. K. Woodbridge (MA)

1956

- Mary Cavendish, Duchess of Devonshire (LLD)
- Colonel Hugh Fortescue, 5th Earl Fortescue (LLD)
- Sir Hector Hetherington (LLD)
- J. L. Morill (LLD)
- David Lindsay, 28th Earl of Crawford (DLitt)
- John Murray (DLitt)
- Robert Gascoyne-Cecil, 5th Marquess of Salisbury (DLitt)
- Sir James Chadwick (DSc)

== See also ==
- List of University of Exeter people
