= Gillings =

Gillings is a surname. Notable people with the surname include:

- Dennis Gillings (born 1944), British-born American statistician and entrepreneur
- Mireille Gillings (born 1963), Canadian neurobiologist and entrepreneur
- Richard Gillings (born 1945), Archdeacon of Macclesfield from 1994 to 2010
- Zoe Gillings (born 1985), Manx snowboarder
