= IQVIA =

American healthcare company

IQVIA Holdings, Inc.

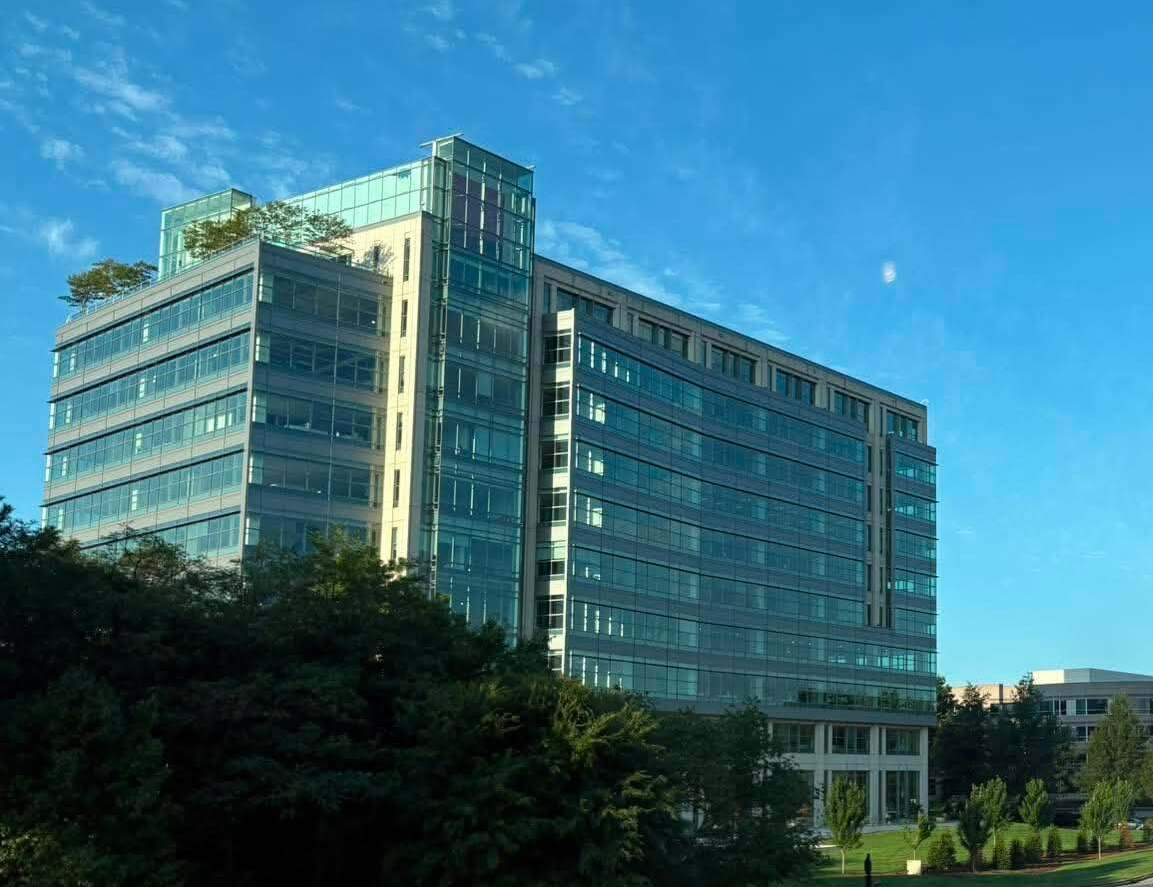
- Type: Public
- Traded as: NYSE: IQV; S&P 500 component
- Industry: Contract Research Organization; Pharmaceutical Service, AI, IT, Consulting
- Founded: 1982; 44 years ago
- Founder: Dennis Gillings
- Headquarters: Durham, North Carolina, U.S.
- Key people: Ari Bousbib (Chairman & CEO)
- Products: Strategy & Operation Consulting, Support services for pharmaceutical, biotech and medical companies and individuals
- Revenue: ▲US$16.3 billion (2025)
- Operating income: ▼US$2.18 billion (2025)
- Net income: ▼US$1.36 billion (2025)
- Total assets: ▲US$29.9 billion (2025)
- Total equity: ▲US$6.63 billion (2025)
- Number of employees: 93,000 (2025)
- Website: iqvia.com

IQVIA Holdings, Inc. is an American health information technology and clinical research company headquartered in Durham, North Carolina. The company provides clinical research services, healthcare analytics, technology solutions, and commercial outsourcing services to pharmaceutical, biotechnology, medical device, and healthcare organizations worldwide.

IQVIA operates through three business segments: Technology & Analytics Solutions, Research & Development Solutions, and Contract Sales & Medical Solutions. Through its technology and analytics business, the company maintains access to more than one billion supposedly anonymized patient records globally, and provides healthcare data, analytics, and software services to life science organizations, health care centers like hospitals, and pharmacists worldwide. This participates in extending their access to personal health data around the globe.

The company was formed in 2016 through the merger of Quintiles, a contact research organization, and IMS Health, a healthcare data and analytics provider. The combined company operated as QuintilesIMS before adopting the name IQVIA in 2017. The IQVIA name is a combination of: I (IMS Health), Q (Quintiles), and VIA (by way of).

== History ==
The company operates three divisions: Technology & Analytics (40% of 2024 revenues), focused on health information technology with access to 1.2 billion unique non-identified patient records globally, offers cloud-based customer relationship management application software as well as analytics consulting services all to the healthcare industry; Research & Development (55% of 2024 revenues), which is a contract research organization that handles all aspects of clinical trials including phase I through IV clinical trial management, clinical pharmacology, post-approval services, regulatory affairs, protocol design, operational planning, study and site start-up, patient recruitment, project management, monitoring, data management and biostatistics; and Contract Sales & Medical (5% of 2024 revenues), which offers contract sales to healthcare providers and patient engagement services.

=== IMS Health ===
IMS (Intercontinental Medical Statistics) Health was founded in 1954 by Bill Frohlich and David Dubow, and headquartered in Danbury, Connecticut, United States.

In 1998, the parent company, Cognizant Corporation, split into two companies: IMS Health and Nielsen Media Research. After this restructuring, Cognizant Technology Solutions became a public subsidiary of IMS Health.

IMS Health sold its entire 56% stake in Cognizant, and the two companies became independent entities: IMS Health and Cognizant.

=== Quintiles ===
Quintiles was the world's largest provider of biopharmaceutical development and commercial outsourcing services. The company offered clinical data management, clinical trial execution services, pharmaceuticals, drug development, financial partnering, and commercialization expertise to companies in the biotechnology, pharmaceutical and healthcare sectors.

In 1982, Dennis Gillings founded and incorporated Quintiles Transnational in North Carolina. Quintiles Transnational established Quintiles Pacific Inc. and Quintiles Ireland Ltd. in 1990. In 1991 Quintiles GmbH was established in Germany and Quintiles Laboratories Ltd. was established in Atlanta, Georgia. In September 1996, Quintiles purchased Innovex Ltd. of Britain for $747.5 million in stock. Quintiles went public in 1997 and completed a successful secondary stock offering.

- In 1974, Dennis Gillings signs the first contract to provide statistical and data management consulting for pharmaceutical clients.
- In 1982, Quintiles, Inc., is incorporated in North Carolina.
- In 1990, Quintiles Pacific Inc. and Quintiles Ireland Ltd. are established.
- In 1991, Quintiles GmbH is established in Germany; Quintiles Laboratories Ltd. is established in Atlanta, Georgia.
- In 1996, Quintiles buys Innovex Ltd. and BRI International Inc., becoming the world's largest CRO.
- In 1997, Quintiles goes public, completing a successful secondary stock offering.
- In 1998, Quintiles becomes the first company in the industry to break the $1 billion mark, when it reports net revenues of $1.19 billion.
- In 1999, the company joins the S&P 500 Index.
- In 2003, the Board of Directors agrees to merge with Pharma Services Holdings Inc; Quintiles becomes a private company.
- In 2009, Quintiles opens new corporate headquarters in Durham, North Carolina.
- In 2010, Quintiles opens new European headquarters in the UK and establishes operations in East Africa.
- In 2011, Quintiles buys Advion Biosciences, a bioanalytical lab based out of Ithaca, New York.
- In 2013, Quintiles filed for an IPO on 15 February in order to go public again; Quintiles begins trading on the New York Stock Exchange (NYSE) under ticker symbol Q."

=== Merger of IMS Health and Quintiles ===
In October 2016, Quintiles merged with IMS Health to form QuintilesIMS. In November 2017, the company adopted the new name of IQVIA.

The company is ranked 282nd on the Fortune 500 and 680th on the Forbes Global 2000.

== Controversies ==
IMS Health's business of collecting and selling pharmaceutical sales data, even though they say it is anonymized, was under scrutiny from both the media and the legal system.

IMS Health v. Ayotte was a free speech case involving IMS Health.

Sorrell v. IMS Health Inc. was a case about physician-data privacy, which went to the U.S. Supreme Court. The court ruled in favor of the company.

IQVIA was contracted by the UK government's Office of National Statistics to provide data on the prevalence of COVID-19 infection in the population. Some users of the survey reported problems contacting IQVIA and arranging for testing. The problems with how the survey results were collected were criticised for potentially leading to biased data by New Scientist.

On July 17, 2023, the Federal Trade Commission sued to block IQVIA’s acquisition of Propel Media alleging in an administrative complaint that the acquisition would give IQVIA a market-leading position in health care programmatic advertising and would raise health-care prices for consumers. In December 2023, U.S. District Court Judge Edgardo Ramos issued an order granting the FTC’s motion for preliminary injunction to block the merger. Speaking in favor of the FTC, Ramos said, "The FTC has shown that there is a reasonable probability that the proposed acquisition will substantially impair competition in the relevant market and that the equities weigh in favor of injunctive relief." An administrative trial was scheduled to start on January 18, 2024. However, on January 5, 2024, IQVIA and Propel Media announced that they had mutually agreed to abandon the proposed merger.
