= Margaret Jackson (physician) =

Family planning pioneer

Margaret Constance Noel Jackson (née Hadley, 18 December 1898 – 11 October 1987) was a family planning pioneer, scientist and advocate for widely accessible sexual health services in the UK. She helped to establish the first family planning clinic in the South-West of England in 1930, and championed family planning services for the following 53 years, nationally and internationally, becoming a renowned expert in fertility and infertility treatment.

== Early life ==
Born in Reigate and educated at the Kerri School, Margaret Jackson was one of few women admitted to medical school in the aftermath of World War I, first at University College and later, for clinical medicine, at the London Hospital, where her father Wilfred Hadley was a Consultant Physician. There, she met Lawrence ("John") Nelson Jackson MC, whom she married in 1925. After qualifying, in 1926 they moved to Crediton in Devon, where her husband became a General practitioner.

== Medical practice ==
General Practice in rural England in the 1920's had no antibiotic, a limited pharmacopoeia and communications were difficult. Obstetrics procedures were performed in the home or in the town's nursing home, which Margaret and John supported until the mid 1950's. They used chloroform as anaesthesia for over 4,000 postpartum confinements without mishap. In the early 1930s they also traced the cause of an outbreak of "Devonshire colic" in local cider drinkers to poisoning from lead dissolved overnight in the pipes at the bar.

== Family planning pioneer ==
Motivated to better women's health in the local area and that of their families, Margaret Jackson launched many family planning initiatives, ranging from contraceptives and birth control to sexual health advice and infertility treatments. The politics and cultural context meant that such initiatives often attracted criticism and Dr Jackson's work encountered its full measure of controversy.

On 1 January 1930 Margaret Jackson took the position of medical officer at the new birth control clinic that the Exeter and District Women's Welfare Association had just opened. Following the Exeter clinic's early success, further clinics opened in Plymouth (1932), Barnstaple (1933) and Totnes (1934). In 1934, Devon was reported as being "the most well provided county for family planning services compared with the whole of England". Dr Margaret Jackson was responsible for, and working in, them all, and steadily expanding their services.

With others, she built wider support to advance this cause as a founder member of the Family Planning Association (formerly the National Birth Control Council), the Society for the Study of Fertility, the International Planned Parenthood Federation and the National Association of Family Planning Doctors; she set up an adoption agency through the Devon Diocesan Council for Family and Social Welfare. She also acted as a local magistrate.

In 1944 she and Clare Harvey, a skilled infertility researcher at the Exeter clinic, hosted an initial gathering of scientists that led to the foundation of the Society for the Study of Fertility in 1950. She attended the international conference in Mumbai (Bombay) in 1952 at which the IPPF was founded and spoke sympathetically about fertility issues facing sub-fertile and infertile couples, urging that they should not be neglected in family planning programmes. In 1953, she gave two papers at the First International Congress on Sterility in New York City.

She became convenor of the IPPF's Medical sub-committee on Testing of Contraceptive Products (Evaluation) in 1955 and continued to lead this group for many years, being an acknowledged expert and being largely responsible for the introduction of internationally agreed standard tests. In 1963, she gave the Oliver Bird Lecture on Oral Contraception in Practice, a meeting attended by the pioneer of the oral contraceptive pill, Gregory G. Pincus, and in the same year she became convenor of a new Oral Contraceptive Group established by the IPPF, later becoming a consultant adviser to the IPPF Medical Committee itself.

By 1987, most family planning doctors in England had either been taught directly by Margaret Jackson or by one of those whom she trained. She linked her teaching and clinical work with that careful research, which led to an international reputation for her contribution to the development of the intrauterine device (IUD) and the early testing of the pill, and for her meticulous investigation and management of infertility. For this pioneering work, she received her Fellowship of the Royal College of Obstetricians and Gynaecologists (1970), an Honorary Doctorate from the University of Exeter (1972) and the Society for Reproduction and Fertility's Marshall Medal (1979).

== Personal life ==
Margaret Jackson had an enormous enthusiasm for sporting activities. She was a Devon county hockey player and club tennis player, and was widely known locally for having a reputation as a skilled horsewoman and a fearless sailor, and for enjoying fast cars. She was an active supporter of the Girl Guide Movement, organising Guide meetings and many camping trips in the 1930s. She had three children, a daughter and two sons.

Margaret Jackson's energy provided many opportunities for others to continue her work through the organisations and institutions that she developed in her life.

She was the granddaughter of artists Henry Tanworth Wells and Joanna Mary Boyce, who died in childbirth aged 31.

== Key works ==
- Harvey, Clare, and Jackson, Margaret Hadley (July 1945). Assessment of male fertility by semen analysis: an attempt to standardise methods. Elsevier Ltd, The Lancet, 246 (6361): 99-104.
- Jackson, Margaret Hadley, and Harvey, Clare (July 1948). Variations in spermatogenesis of oligospermic men. England, Nature (London), 162 (4106): 67-67.
- Russell, P. M.; Jackson, M. H.; Midgley, R. L. (1951). "A personal study of forty cases of pelvic tuberculosis". BJOG: An International Journal of Obstetrics & Gynaecology. 58 (5): 712–732. doi:10.1111/j.1471-0528.1951.tb04049.x. PMID 14889332.
- Jackson M. H. (August 1952). Clinical methods of determining ovulation. The Practitioner, 169(1010): 151–160.
- Harvey, Clare, and Jackson, Margaret H. (1955). Studies on fertility. London: BMJ Publishing Group Ltd and Association of Clinical Pathologists, Journal of Clinical Pathology, 8 (2): 183-184.
- Jackson M. H. (January 1957). Artificial insemination (donor). The Eugenics review, 48(4): 203–211.
- Jackson, M. C. (August 1963). Oral contraception in practice. England, Journal of reproduction & fertility, 6 (1): 153-173.
- Jackson, Margaret C.N., Frampton, John, and Frith, Kathleen (July 1965). Intrauterine contraceptive devices. Elsevier Ltd, The Lancet, 286 (7402): 83–84.
- Jackson, M. C. N.; Richardson, D. W. (April 1977) The use of fresh and frozen semen in human artificial insemination. Cambridge, UK: Cambridge University Press, Journal of biosocial science, 9 (2): 251-262.
