= Four-spiral semigroup =

Algebraic structure in mathematics

In mathematics, the four-spiral semigroup is a special semigroup generated by four idempotent elements. This special semigroup was first studied by Karl Byleen in a doctoral dissertation submitted to the University of Nebraska–Lincoln in 1977. It has several interesting properties: it is one of the most important examples of bi-simple but not completely-simple semigroups; it is also an important example of a fundamental regular semigroup; it is an indispensable building block of bisimple, idempotent-generated regular semigroups. A certain semigroup, called double four-spiral semigroup, generated by five idempotent elements has also been studied along with the four-spiral semigroup.

== Definition ==
The four-spiral semigroup, denoted by Sp_{4}, is the free semigroup generated by four elements a, b, c, and d satisfying the following eleven conditions:

- a^{2} = a, b^{2} = b, c^{2} = c, d^{2} = d.
- ab = b, ba = a, bc = b, cb = c, cd = d, dc = c.
- da = d.

The first set of conditions imply that the elements a, b, c, d are idempotents. The second set of conditions imply that a R b L c R d where R and L are the Green's relations in a semigroup. The lone condition in the third set can be written as d ω^{l} a, where ω^{l} is a biorder relation defined by Nambooripad. The diagram below summarises the various relations among a, b, c, d:

$$\begin{matrix}
&    &       \mathcal{R}            &    & \\
&  a &  \longleftrightarrow & b  & \\
\omega^l  & \Big \uparrow  &                     & \Big  \updownarrow & \mathcal{L} \\
&  d  & \longleftrightarrow & c & \\
&     &     \mathcal{R}               &    &
\end{matrix}$$

== Elements of the four-spiral semigroup ==
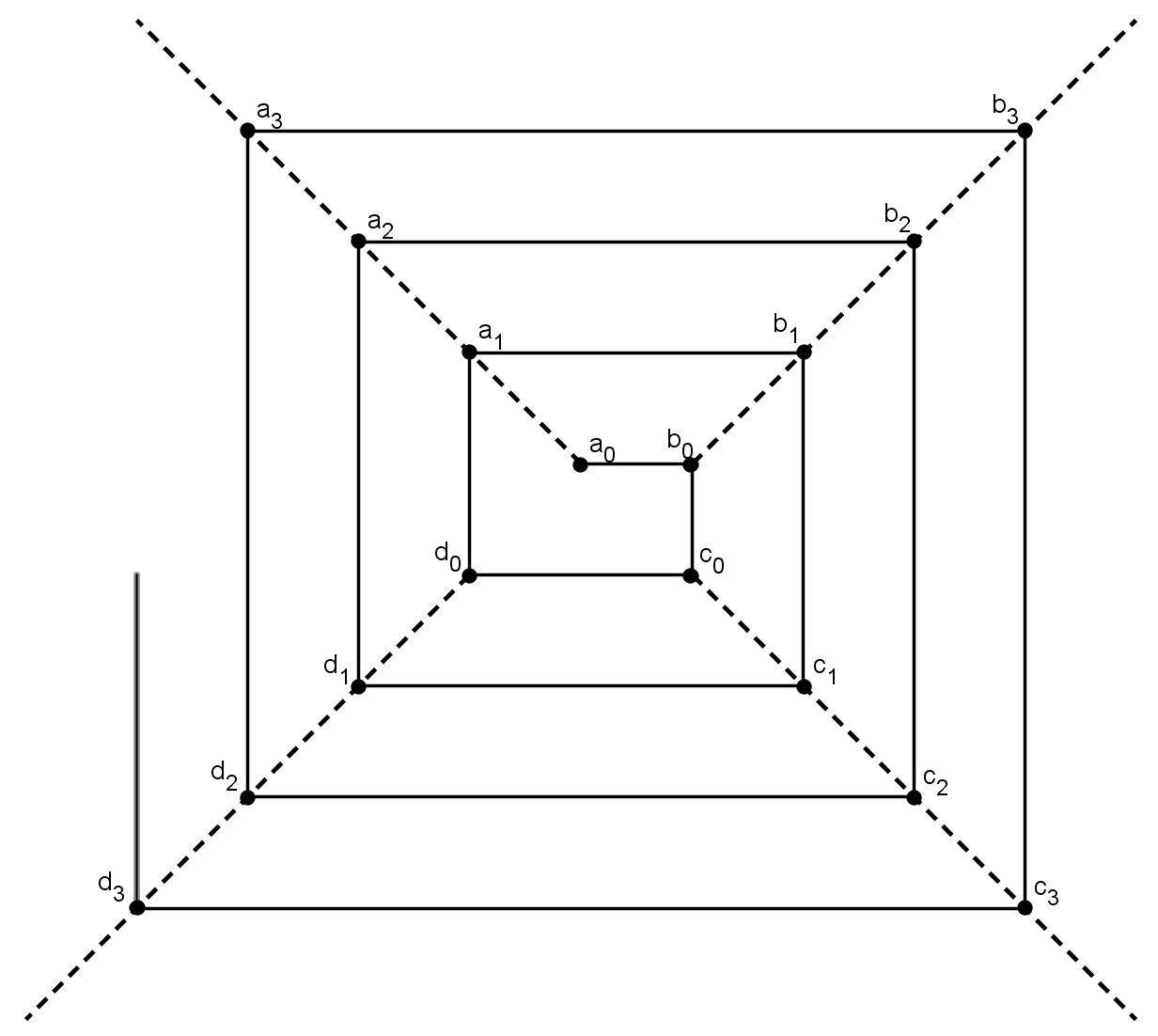
The spiral structure of idempotents in the four-spiral semigroup Sp4. In this diagram, elements in the same row are R-related, elements in the same column are L-related, and the order proceeds down the four diagonals (away from the center).

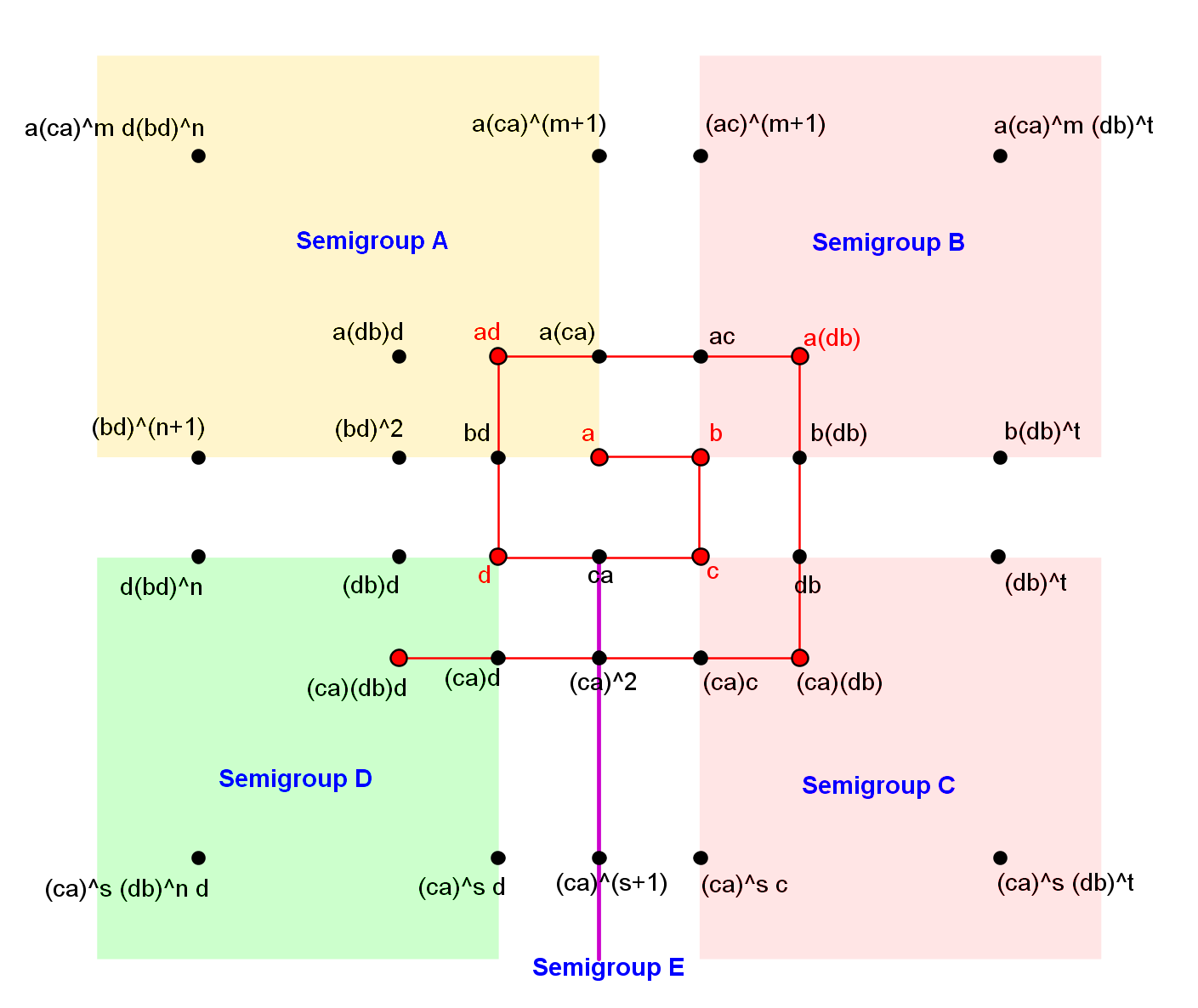
The structure of the four-spiral semigroup Sp4. The set of idempotents (red coloured points) and the subsemigroups A, B, C, D, E are shown.

=== General elements ===
Every element of Sp_{4} can be written uniquely in one of the following forms:

[c] (ac)^{m} [a]
[d] (bd)^{n} [b]
[c] (ac)^{m} ad (bd)^{n} [b]

where m and n are non-negative integers and terms in square brackets may be omitted as long as the remaining product is not empty. The forms of these elements imply that Sp_{4} has a partition Sp_{4} = A ∪ B ∪ C ∪ D ∪ E where

A = { a(ca)^{n}, (bd)^{n+1}, a(ca)^{m}d(bd)^{n} : m, n non-negative integers }
B = { (ac)^{n+1}, b(db)^{n}, a(ca)^{m}(db) ^{n+1} : m, n non-negative integers }
C = { c(ac)^{m}, (db)^{n+1}, (ca)^{m+1}(db)^{n+1} : m, n non-negative integers }
D = { d(bd)^{n}, (ca)^{m+1}(db)^{n+1}d : m, n non-negative integers }
E = { (ca)^{m} : m positive integer }

The sets A, B, C, D are bicyclic semigroups, E is an infinite cyclic semigroup and the subsemigroup D ∪ E is a nonregular semigroup.

=== Idempotent elements ===
The set of idempotents of Sp_{4}, is {a_{n}, b_{n}, c_{n}, d_{n} : n = 0, 1, 2, ...} where, a_{0} = a, b_{0} = b, c_{0} = c, d_{0} = d, and for n = 0, 1, 2, ....,

a_{n+1} = a(ca)^{n}(db)^{n}d
b_{n+1} = a(ca)^{n}(db)^{n+1}
c_{n+1} = (ca)^{n+1}(db)^{n+1}
d_{n+1} = (ca)^{n+1}(db)^{n+l}d

The sets of idempotents in the subsemigroups A, B, C, D (there are no idempotents in the subsemigroup E) are respectively:

E_{A} = { a_{n} : n = 0,1,2, ... }
E_{B} = { b_{n} : n = 0,1,2, ... }
E_{C} = { c_{n} : n = 0,1,2, ... }
E_{D} = { d_{n} : n = 0,1,2, ... }

== Four-spiral semigroup as a Rees-matrix semigroup ==
Let S be the set of all quadruples (r, x, y, s) where r, s, ∈ { 0, 1 } and x and y are nonnegative integers and define a binary operation in S by

$$(r, x, y, s) * (t, z, w, u) =
\begin{cases}
(r, x-y + \max(y , z + 1),  \max(y - 1,  z) -  z + w,  u) & \text{if }  s = 0, t = 1\\
(r,  x - y+ \max(y,  z),  \max(y, z) -  z + w, u)&\text{otherwise.}
\end{cases}$$

The set S with this operation is a Rees matrix semigroup over the bicyclic semigroup, and the four-spiral semigroup Sp_{4} is isomorphic to S.

== Properties ==
- By definition itself, the four-spiral semigroup is an idempotent generated semigroup (Sp_{4} is generated by the four idempotents a, b, c, d.)
- The four-spiral semigroup is a fundamental semigroup, that is, the only congruence on Sp_{4} which is contained in the Green's relation H in Sp_{4} is the equality relation.

== Double four-spiral semigroup ==
The fundamental double four-spiral semigroup, denoted by DSp_{4}, is the semigroup generated by five elements a, b, c, d, e satisfying the following conditions:

- a^{2} = a, b^{2} = b, c^{2} = c, d^{2} = d, e^{2} = e
- ab = b, ba = a, bc = b, cb = c, cd = d, dc = c, de = d, ed = e
- ae = e, ea = e

The first set of conditions imply that the elements a, b, c, d, e are idempotents. The second set of conditions state the Green's relations among these idempotents, namely, a R b L c R d L e. The two conditions in the third set imply that e ω a where ω is the biorder relation defined as ω = ω^{l} ∩ ω^{r}.
