= Rees factor semigroup =

In mathematics, in semigroup theory, a Rees factor semigroup (also called Rees quotient semigroup or just Rees factor), named after David Rees, is a certain semigroup constructed using a semigroup and an ideal of the semigroup.

Let S be a semigroup and I be an ideal of S. Using S and I one can construct a new semigroup by collapsing I into a single element while the elements of S outside of I retain their identity. The new semigroup obtained in this way is called the Rees factor semigroup of S modulo I and is denoted by S/I.

The concept of Rees factor semigroup was introduced by David Rees in 1940.

== Formal definition ==
A subset $I$ of a semigroup $S$ is called an ideal of $S$ if both $SI$ and $IS$ are subsets of $I$ (where $SI = \{sx \mid s \in S \text{ and } x \in I\}$, and similarly for $IS$). Let $I$ be an ideal of a semigroup $S$. The relation $\rho$ in $S$ defined by

x ρ y ⇔ either x = y or both x and y are in I

is an equivalence relation in $S$. The equivalence classes under $\rho$ are the singleton sets $\{x\}$ with $x$ not in $I$ and the set $I$. Since $I$ is an ideal of $S$, the relation $\rho$ is a congruence on $S$. The quotient semigroup $S/{\rho}$ is, by definition, the Rees factor semigroup of $S$ modulo $I$. For notational convenience the semigroup $S/\rho$ is also denoted as $S/I$. The Rees factor semigroup has underlying set $(S \setminus I) \cup \{0\}$, where $0$ is a new element and the product (here denoted by $*$) is defined by

$$s * t = \begin{cases} st & \text{if } s, t, st \in S \setminus I \\
0  & \text{otherwise}. \end{cases}$$

The congruence $\rho$ on $S$ as defined above is called the Rees congruence on $S$ modulo $I$.

== Example ==
Consider the semigroup S = { a, b, c, d, e } with the binary operation defined by the following Cayley table:

·	a	b	c	d	e
a	a	a	a	d	d
b	a	b	c	d	d
c	a	c	b	d	d
d	d	d	d	a	a
e	d	e	e	a	a

Let I = { a, d } which is a subset of S. Since

SI = { aa, ba, ca, da, ea, ad, bd, cd, dd, ed } = { a, d } ⊆ I
IS = { aa, da, ab, db, ac, dc, ad, dd, ae, de } = { a, d } ⊆ I

the set I is an ideal of S. The Rees factor semigroup of S modulo I is the set S/I = { b, c, e, I } with the binary operation defined by the following Cayley table:

·	b	c	e	I
b	b	c	I	I
c	c	b	I	I
e	e	e	I	I
I	I	I	I	I

== Ideal extension ==
A semigroup S is called an ideal extension of a semigroup A by a semigroup B if A is an ideal of S and the Rees factor semigroup S/A is isomorphic to B.

Some of the cases that have been studied extensively include: ideal extensions of completely simple semigroups, of a group by a completely 0-simple semigroup, of a commutative semigroup with cancellation by a group with added zero. In general, the problem of describing all ideal extensions of a semigroup is still open.
