= IMS Health =

Defunct American information services company

Ims Health Inc.
- Company type: Subsidiary
- Industry: Healthcare, Information Services, Technology
- Founded: 1954 as Information Medical Statistics
- Fate: Merged with Quintiles to form IQVIA
- Successor: IQVIA
- Headquarters: Danbury, Connecticut, USA; Durham, North Carolina, USA
- Products: Healthcare Measurement, Analytics & Services, Consulting, Technology Services
- Revenue: $2.64B (2015)
- Number of employees: 14,000+ (2015)
- Website: iqvia.com

IMS Health was an American company that provided information, services and technology for the healthcare industry. IMS stood for Intercontinental Medical Statistics. It was the largest vendor of U.S. physician prescribing data. IMS Health was founded in 1954 by Bill Frohlich and David Dubow with Arthur Sackler having a hidden ownership stake. In 2010, IMS Health was taken private by TPG Capital, CPP Investment Board and Leonard Green & Partners. The company went public on April 4, 2014, and began trading on the NYSE under the symbol IMS. IMS Health was headquartered in Danbury, Connecticut.

Over 2016 Quintiles and IMS Health merged, and the resulting company was named QuintilesIMS, which was renamed to IQVIA in 2017.

== Business model ==
IMS Health was best known for its collection of healthcare information spanning sales, de-identified prescription data, medical claims, electronic medical records and social media. IMS Health's products and services were used by companies to develop commercialization plans and portfolio strategies, to select patient and physician populations for specific therapies, and to measure the effectiveness of pharmaceutical marketing and sales resources. The firm uses its own data to produce syndicated reports such as market forecasts and market intelligence.

== History and acquisitions ==
The original name of the company was Intercontinental Marketing Statistics, hence the IMS name. IMS Health's corporate headquarters is located in Danbury, Connecticut, United States. The company's chairman and CEO is Ari Bousbib.

- In 1998, the parent company, Cognizant Corporation, split into two companies: IMS Health and Nielsen Media Research. After this restructuring, Cognizant Technology Solutions became a public subsidiary of IMS Health
- In 2002, IMS Health acquired Cambridge Pharma Consultancy, a privately held international firm that provides strategic advice to pharmaceutical management.
- In 2002, IMS Health acquired the Rosenblatt Klauber Group, a privately held international consultancy that provides forecasting, opportunity assessment & management development services to pharmaceutical companies.
- In 2003, acquired Marketing Initiatives, a specialist in healthcare facility profile data, and Data Niche Associates, a provider of rebate validation services for Medicaid and managed care. In 2003, IMS Health sold its entire 56% stake in Cognizant and both companies are separated into two independent entities as IMS Health and Cognizant
- In 2004, United Research China Shanghai was acquired, providing coverage of China's consumer health market.
- In 2005, acquired PharMetrics, a U.S. provider of patient-centric integrated claims data.
- In 2006, acquired the Life Sciences practice of Strategic Decisions Group, a portfolio strategy consultant to the life sciences industry.
- In 2007, IMS Health acquired IHS and MedInitiatives, providers of healthcare data management analytics and technology services. That same year, ValueMedics Research was acquired, extending IMS Health's health economics and outcomes research capabilities.
- In 2007, ranked in the Businessweek 50. This list represents "best in class" companies from the ten economic sectors that make up the S&P 500.
- In 2008, named to the World's Most Admired Companies list by Fortune. The company received the recognition again in 2010.
- In 2008, acquired RMBC, a provider of national pharmaceutical market intelligence and analytics in Russia.
- In 2008, acquired the Skura professional services group, based out of Mississauga, Ontario, Canada and specialized in data integration, consulting and services in business intelligence platforms to pharmaceutical and healthcare clients in North America and Europe.
- In 2009, named to the Dow Jones Sustainability North America Index in recognition of the company's economic, environmental and social performance among the largest 600 North American companies.
- In February 2010, IMS Health was taken private by TPG Capital, CPP Investment Board, and Leonard Green & Partners.
- In 2010, acquired Brogan, Inc., a privately held market research and consulting firm serving the Canada healthcare market.
- In 2011, expanded its specialty and patient-level data assets in the United States with the acquisition of SDI Health. Also that year, the company acquired Ardentia Ltd in the UK, and Med-Vantage in the United States to build on its payer services in those markets.
- In 2012, acquired PharmARC Analytic Solutions Pvt. Ltd, a Bangalore-based analytics company.
- In 2012, acquired DecisionView, a software solutions company that helps life sciences organizations plan and track patient enrollment for clinical trials and TTC, a benchmarking solutions and analytics company that helps clients plan for and negotiate the costs of clinical trials. Also in 2012, the company purchased PharmaDeals Ltd., a provider of online information about business transactions, licensing, and mergers and acquisitions activity within the pharmaceutical industry.
- In 2013, acquired several companies to expand its portfolio of SaaS products: Incential Software, a provider of sales performance management technology services; 360 Vantage, which delivers multi-channel CRM software capabilities; Appature, which offers a relationship marketing platform; and Semantelli, a provider of social media analytics for the global healthcare industry.
- In May 2015, IMS increased its software development capability by acquiring Dataline Software Ltd, a bespoke software development company and big data research specialist in the UK.
- In April 2015, IMS Health completed the purchase of Cegedim's Customer Relationship Management (CRM) software and Strategic Data business for €396 million. Cegedim acquired the software and related business when it purchased Dendrite International in 2007.
- In August 2015, IMS Health completed the purchase of Boston Biomedical Consultants, a provider of market data and market research covering the in vitro Diagnostics market
- In May 2016, the company announced it would merge with Quintiles IMS Health shareholders received 0.384 shares of Quintiles common stock for each share of IMS Health common stock they held, leaving the split of ownership at 51.4% IMS and 48.6% Quintiles. The merger was completed in October and the resulting company was a $17.6 billion company called QuintilesIMS.
- On November 6, 2017, the company adopted the new name of IQVIA.

== Controversy ==
Throughout its history, IMS Health's business of collecting anonymized pharmaceutical sales data came under scrutiny from both the media and the legal system.

IMS Health v. Ayotte was a free speech case involving IMS Health.

Sorrell v. IMS Health Inc. was a case about physician-data privacy, which went to the U.S. Supreme Court., the High Court ruled in favor of the company.
