= L. W. Frohlich =

German-American businessman

- Born: Ludwig Wolfgang Frohlich; 1913
- Died: 1971 (aged 57–58)

Ludwig William Frohlich (1913–1971) was a German-born American pharmaceutical advertising and radio broadcast businessman.

== Early life and education ==
Ludwig William Frohlich was born on July 30, 1913, in Frankfurt, Germany into a Jewish family. He received his B.S. in 1931 at the age of 18 from Johann Wolfgang Goethe-Universität Frankfurt am Main. He studied also at the École Diderot(?) and the École nationale supérieure des Beaux-Arts de Paris in France. His specialty was type design and art direction.

In 1935, after Hitler took power, he moved to the United States as an exchange student, lived at International House of New York, later, became a trustee, and organized the alumni association. In 1938, Frohlich became an American citizen.

== Businesses ==
- L. W. Frohlich & Co./Intercon International, a pharmaceutical advertising agency, founded in 1941, main office in NYC
- IMS International, a market research company in the fields of chemistry, medicine, pharmacy, airlines and optics, founded in 1954, offices throughout the world
- National Science Network, a chain of FM radio stations

- WNCN in New York
- WDHF in Chicago
- KPPC (defunct)
- KPPC (AM)
- KPPC (FM)
- KMPX (FM)

The Concert Network, Inc. (initiated in 1955, reorganized from General Broadcasting Corporation), was a network of FM stations owned by T. Mitchell Hastings, Jr., that primarily provided classical music programming, originating from WBCN in Boston, with affiliates that included: WHCN in Hartford, Connecticut, WNCN in New York City, WRCN in Riverhead, New York on Long Island and WXCN (first in chain) in Providence, Rhode Island.

In November 1969, The National Science Network, Inc. purchased KMPX (FM) in San Francisco, and KPPC (AM) and KPPC-FM in Pasadena from Crosby-Pacific Broadcasting Company for a combined $1,084,000.

Arthur Sackler was a career-long "cooperative" competitor and friend.

== Personal life ==
Frohlich had a villa on the island of Elba. In January 1971, Frohlich was diagnosed with a brain tumor, and he died in September. Frohlich was a bachelor, his sister, a Mrs. Burns of New York, was his only immediate survivor.
