= Leszek Borysiewicz =

British immunologist

Sir Leszek Borysiewicz GBE DL FRS FRCP FMedSci FLSW
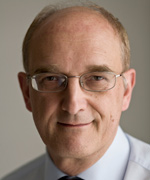
- Borysiewicz in 2008

345th Vice-Chancellor of the University of Cambridge
- In office 1 October 2010 – 1 October 2017
- Chancellor: Prince Philip, Duke of Edinburgh; Lord Sainsbury of Turville
- Preceded by: Dame Alison Richard
- Succeeded by: Stephen Toope

Chief Executive of the Medical Research Council
- In office 1 October 2007 – 30 September 2010
- Minister: John Hutton; Peter Mandelson; Vince Cable
- Preceded by: Colin Blakemore
- Succeeded by: Sir John Savill

Personal details
- Born: Leszek Krzysztof Borysiewicz; 13 April 1951 (age 75) Cardiff, Wales
- Education: Cardiff University School of Medicine (MB BCh); Imperial College London (PhD)
- Occupation: Immunologist and academic
- Scientific career
- Awards: Knight Bachelor; GBE
- Thesis: Cell mediated immunity to human cytomegalovirus infection (cytotoxic T cell and natural killer cell mediated lysis of human cytomegalovirus infected cells) (1986)
- Doctoral advisor: J. G. P. Sissons; Keith Peters

Sir Leszek Krzysztof Borysiewicz (born 13 April 1951) is a British professor, immunologist and scientific administrator. He served as chairman of Cancer Research UK (2016-2023). Prior to that he was Vice-Chancellor of the University of Cambridge (2010-2017) and chief executive of the Medical Research Council (2007-2010).

== Education and early life ==
Leszek Krzysztof Borysiewicz was born in Cardiff, Wales, to Jan and Zofia (née Wołoszyn) Borysiewicz, ethnic Polish World War II-era refugees (from what is present-day Belarus) who came to Great Britain with the Anders' Army. He speaks fluent Polish. After attending Cardiff High School, Borysiewicz studied at Welsh National School of Medicine of Cardiff University, where he obtained a BSc in anatomy 1972, followed by an MB BCh medical degree in 1975. He received a PhD degree from Imperial College London (then part of the University of London) in 1986 for his thesis on Cell mediated immunity to human cytomegalovirus infection (cytotoxic T cell and natural killer cell mediated lysis of human cytomegalovirus infected cells) supervised by J. G. P. Sissons and Keith Peters. He received a Fellowship of the Royal College of Physicians (FRCP) in 1989. In 2010, Borysiewicz was awarded with an MA degree from the University of Cambridge, upon his inauguration as the new Vice-Chancellor of this University.

== Career and research ==
Borysiewicz pursued a career in academic medicine at the University of Cambridge, where he was a fellow of Wolfson College, and then as a consultant at Hammersmith Hospital. He headed the Department of Medicine at the University of Wales before joining Imperial College London, where he was promoted to Deputy Rector responsible "for the overall academic and scientific direction of the College," In September 2007, it was reported he would succeed Colin Blakemore as the 9th head of the Medical Research Council, a national organisation that supports medical science with an annual budget of around £500 million.

Borysiewicz was appointed as chairman of Cancer Research UK in November 2016. Cancer Research UK is one of the world's largest fundraising charities and is governed by a council of trustees, led by Borysiewicz. The council's role is to set the charity's strategic direction, uphold its value and governance, and guide, advise and support the chief executive.

Borysiewicz previously chaired the European Research Council Identification Committee (2014-2020); Scientific Advisory Board, Department for International Development, UK Government (2010-2016); and Joint MRC/UK Stem Cell Foundation Scientific Advisory Board (2005-2007). In April 2026, the UK government announced that Sir Leszek was to be the next Chair of UK Research and Innovation from July 2026.

He currently holds several other roles, including as a member of the UK Health Honours Committee, Wales Science and Innovation Council, as a non-executive director at 52 North Health, and Chair of Diamond Light Source, the UK's national synchrotron facility.

Borysiewicz's research focuses on viral immunology, infectious disease, and viral-induced cancer. His work in vaccines included Europe's first trial of a vaccine for human papillomavirus to treat cervical cancer, research conducted at Cardiff University. He has co-authored and co-edited a number of books on these subjects, including Vaccinations.

=== Awards and honours ===
Borysiewicz was knighted by Queen Elizabeth II in the 2001 New Year Honours List for services to Medical Research and Education. He was appointed a Deputy Lieutenant of Cambridgeshire (DL) in 2012. In October 2018, he was awarded the Grand Cross of the Order of Merit of the Republic of Poland, the highest-ranked Polish order of merit awarded to foreigners or Poles resident abroad for their services to Poland. He collected it during a ceremony at the Polish Embassy in London in late April 2019. He was appointed a Knight Grand Cross of the Order of the British Empire (GBE) by King Charles III in the 2025 New Year Honours List for services to Cancer Research, to Clinical Research, to Medicine and to Charities.

Borysiewicz was awarded as Honorary Fellow of the Royal College of Pathologists (Hon FRCPath) in 2001. In 2002, he was awarded the Moxon Trust Medal of the Royal College of Physicians. He was also a Governor of the Wellcome Trust, a founding Fellow of the Academy of Medical Sciences (FMedSci) and co-chair of the MRC's advisory group on stem cell research. In 2008, Borysiewicz was awarded with the honorary degree of Doctor of Science (Hon DSc) from the University of Hull as well one from the University of Southampton, and was elected a Fellow of the Royal Society (FRS). In 2009, he received an honorary Doctor of Science degree (Hon DSc) from the Queen Mary University of London. Also in this year, he was honoured with an honorary Doctor of Science degree (Hon DSc) by the University of Exeter for his contribution to medicine and medical research. He was awarded an honorary Doctorate of Medicine (Hon MD) in 2010 at the University of Sheffield. In the same year, Borysiewicz was also elected a Founding Fellow of the Learned Society of Wales (FLSW). In 2012, Borysiewicz was awarded the honorary degree of Doctor of Science honoris causa (DSc h.c) by the University of Hong Kong in recognition of his contributions to medical research and society. He further received an honorary Doctorate of Law (Hon LLD) from the University of Cambridge in 2018. In 2019, he was awarded an Honorary Doctorate from the Jagiellonian University.

Academic offices
Preceded by Alison Richard	Vice-Chancellor of the University of Cambridge; 2010–2017	Succeeded by Stephen Toope
