= John Savill =

Sir John Savill FRS FMedSci
- Born: John Stewart Savill; 25 April 1957 (age 69)
- Education: University of Oxford (BA); University of Sheffield (MB ChB); Royal Postgraduate Medical School (PhD)
- Awards: Fellow of the Royal Society (2013); Knight Bachelor (2008); Fellow of the Royal College of Physicians; Fellow of the Academy of Medical Sciences; Fellow of the Royal Society of Edinburgh
- Scientific career
- Fields: Medicine; Immunology; Apoptosis
- Workplaces: Hammersmith Hospital; University of Edinburgh; Medical Research Council; University of Oxford; University of Sheffield
- Thesis: Macrophage recognition of senescent neutrophils (1989)
- Website: mrc.ac.uk/about/chief-executive-management-board/

Sir John Stewart Savill (born 25 April 1957) is the Chief Executive of the Medical Research Council (MRC) in the UK and the Head of the College of Medicine and Veterinary Medicine and a Vice Principal of the University of Edinburgh.

== Education ==
Savill was educated at St Catherine's College, Oxford and the University of Sheffield where he gained his Bachelor of Medicine, Bachelor of Surgery in 1981 Savill was awarded a PhD for his work on macrophages from the Royal Postgraduate Medical School in 1989.

== Research and career ==
Savill is widely known for his research is on apoptosis and immunology. As of 2016 Savill is active in acute general medicine and is an Honorary Consultant Physician and Nephrologist with the Lothian University Hospitals Division. He is a member of the Lothian Health Board and chairs its Service Redesign Committee.

Savill has extensive experience in peer review and has a particular interest in research and development, and the career structures necessary for this, having chaired the Academy of Medical Sciences Working Party on Clinical Academic Careers.

John Savill's research interests revolve around the role of cell death and macrophages in resolution and repair of inflammation, especially inflammatory disorders of the kidney glomerulus (glomerulonephritis) and interstitium (tubulointerstitial nephritis).

=== Positions ===
- Vice Principal and Head of the College of Medicine and Veterinary Medicine at the University of Edinburgh since October 2002.
- Professor of Experimental Medicine since 1998.
- Chair of Medicine since 1998
- Chairman of the Physiological Systems and Clinical Sciences Board of the MRC, and is a full member of the Council itself.
- Chief Executive of the Medical Research Council UK since 1 October 2010. As of 2015, Savill was paid a salary of between £170,000 and £174,999 by the MRC, making him one of the 328 most highly paid people in the British public sector at that time.

== Awards and honours ==
He was appointed Knight Bachelor in the 2008 New Year Honours. He was also elected a Fellow of the Royal Society (FRS) in 2013.

He is an honorary member of the British Society for Immunology.

In 1999, he was elected a member of the Harveian Society of Edinburgh and in 2009 he served as President of the Society. He was elected a Fellow of the Australian Academy of Health and Medical Sciences in 2021.

Government offices
Preceded by Leszek Borysiewicz	CEO of the Medical Research Council	Incumbent
