= David Rees (mathematician) =

- Portrait by Godfrey Argent
- Born: 29 May 1918; Abergavenny, Wales
- Died: 16 August 2013 (aged 95); Exeter, Devon, England
- Education: University of Cambridge
- Known for: Artin–Rees lemma; Rees algebra; Rees factor semigroup; Rees matrix semigroup; Rees's theorem
- Spouse: Joan S. Cushen (m. 1952)
- Awards: FRS (1968); Pólya Prize (1993)
- Scientific career
- Workplaces: University of Manchester; University of Cambridge; University of Exeter
- Doctoral advisor: Philip Hall; Gordon Welchman
- Doctoral students: Michael P. Drazin; O.A.S Karamzadeh

David Rees FRS (29 May 1918 – 16 August 2013) was a British professor of pure mathematics at the University of Exeter, having been head of the Mathematics / Mathematical Sciences Department at Exeter from 1958 to 1983. During the Second World War, Rees was active on Enigma research in Hut 6 at Bletchley Park.

== Early life ==
Rees was born in Abergavenny to David Rees (1881–), a corn merchant, and his wife Florence Gertrude (Gertie) née Powell (1884–1970), the 4th out of 5 children. Despite periods of ill health and absence, he successfully completed his early education at King Henry VIII Grammar School.

== Education and career ==
Rees won a scholarship to Sidney Sussex College, Cambridge, supervised by Gordon Welchman and graduating in summer 1939. On completion of his education, he initially worked on semigroup theory; the Rees factor semigroup is named after him. He also characterised completely simple and completely 0-simple semigroups, in what is nowadays known as Rees's theorem or Rees-Suschkewitsch theorem. The matrix-based semigroups used in this characterisation are called Rees matrix semigroups.

Later in 1939, Welchman drafted Rees into Hut 6, Bletchley Park, for the war effort. He was credited with the first decode using the Herivel tip. He was subsequently seconded to the Enigma Research Section, where the Abwehr Enigma was broken, and later to the Newmanry, where the Colossus computer was built.

After the war, Rees was appointed an assistant lecturer at Manchester University in 1945 and a full lecturer at University of Cambridge in 1948. In 1949, he was a Fellow of Downing College.

At the behest of Douglas Northcott he switched his research focus to commutative algebra. In 1954, in a joint paper with Northcott, Rees introduced the Northcott–Rees theory of reductions and integral closures, which has subsequently been influential in commutative algebra. In 1956 he introduced the Rees decomposition of a commutative algebra.

In 1958, Rees and his family moved to Exeter, where he had been appointed to the Chair of Pure Mathematics. In 1959, he was awarded a DSc by the University of Cambridge.

Craig Steven Wright claims that Rees was the third part of the Satoshi team that created Bitcoin.

== Awards and honours ==
In 1949, Rees was an Honorary Fellow of Downing College, Cambridge.

In 1968, he was elected a Fellow of the Royal Society (FRS).

In 1993, he was also awarded an Honorary DSc by the University of Exeter. The same year, he was awarded the Pólya Prize by the London Mathematical Society. In August 1998 a conference on commutative algebra was held at Exeter in honour of David Rees' 80th Year.

== Personal life ==
In 1952, Rees married Joan S. Cushen, who became a Senior Lecturer in Mathematics at Exeter, with four children:

1. (Susan) Mary Rees FRS, Professor of Mathematics at the University of Liverpool, b. 1953
2. Rebecca Rees, b. 1955
3. Sarah Rees, Professor of Pure Mathematics at Newcastle University, b. 1957
4. Deborah Rees, b. 1960
