= Rees matrix semigroup =

In mathematics, the Rees matrix semigroups are a special class of semigroups introduced by David Rees in 1940. They are of fundamental importance in semigroup theory because they are used to classify certain classes of simple semigroups.

== Definition ==
Let S be a semigroup, I and Λ non-empty sets and P a matrix indexed by I and Λ with entries p_{λ,i} taken from S. Then the Rees matrix semigroup M(S; I, Λ; P) is the set I×S×Λ together with the product formula

(i, s, λ)(j, t, μ) = (i, s p_{λ,j} t, μ).

Rees matrix semigroups are an important technique for building new semigroups out of old ones.

== Rees' theorem ==
In his 1940 paper Rees proved the following theorem characterising completely simple semigroups:

A semigroup is completely simple if and only if it is isomorphic to a Rees matrix semigroup over a group.

That is, every completely simple semigroup is isomorphic to a semigroup of the form M(G; I, Λ; P) for some group G. Moreover, Rees proved that if G is a group and G^{0} is the semigroup obtained from G by attaching a zero element, then M(G^{0}; I, Λ; P) is a regular semigroup if and only if every row and column of the matrix P contains an element that is not 0. If such an M(G^{0}; I, Λ; P) is regular, then it is also completely 0-simple.

== See also ==
- Semigroup
- Completely simple semigroup
- David Rees (mathematician)
