= Mireille Gillings =

Neurobiologist and entrepreneur

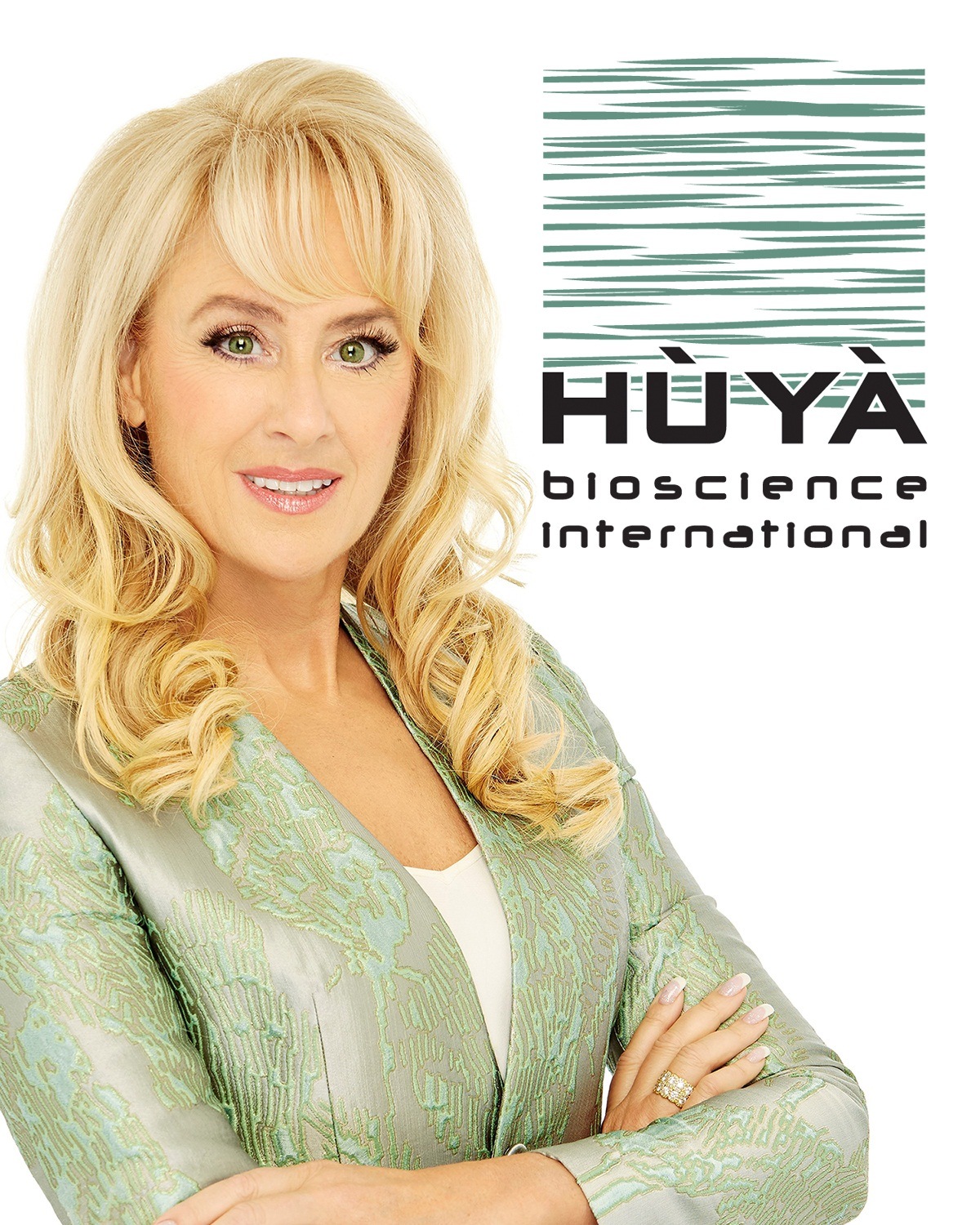
- Mireille Gillings
- Born: 1962 (age 63–64); Montreal, Quebec, Canada
- Education: Radboud University Nijmegen; Bordeaux University; The Scripps Research Institute; Concordia University
- Occupations: neurobiologist and entrepreneur
- Spouse: Sir Dennis Gillings (m. 2012)

Mireille Gingras Gillings (born 1962) is a US-based Canadian neurobiologist and entrepreneur. She founded HUYA Bioscience International, a biotech consulting firm in 2004, and is the San Diego, California, company's CEO and executive chair. The company has offices in Pudong, Shanghai, China.

In 2010, Gillings' interest in China as a source of "research-intensive, expensive-to-develop medicines that are the stuff of patents and high profit margins" attracted the interest of Fortune magazine.

Born in Montreal, Quebec, Gillings earned her PhD from Radboud University Nijmegen and has held postdoctoral fellowships at Bordeaux University in France and The Scripps Research Institute in La Jolla, California. She received her bachelor's degree from Montréal's Concordia University.

Also one of the founders of MIR3, she is a "serial entrepreneur", as she has described herself. Gillings is at least functional in several languages, including Mandarin, in addition to her native French.

== Personal life ==
In 2012, she married Dennis Gillings in Hawaii.
