= Dennis Gillings =

British-born American billionaire

Sir Dennis Gillings CBE
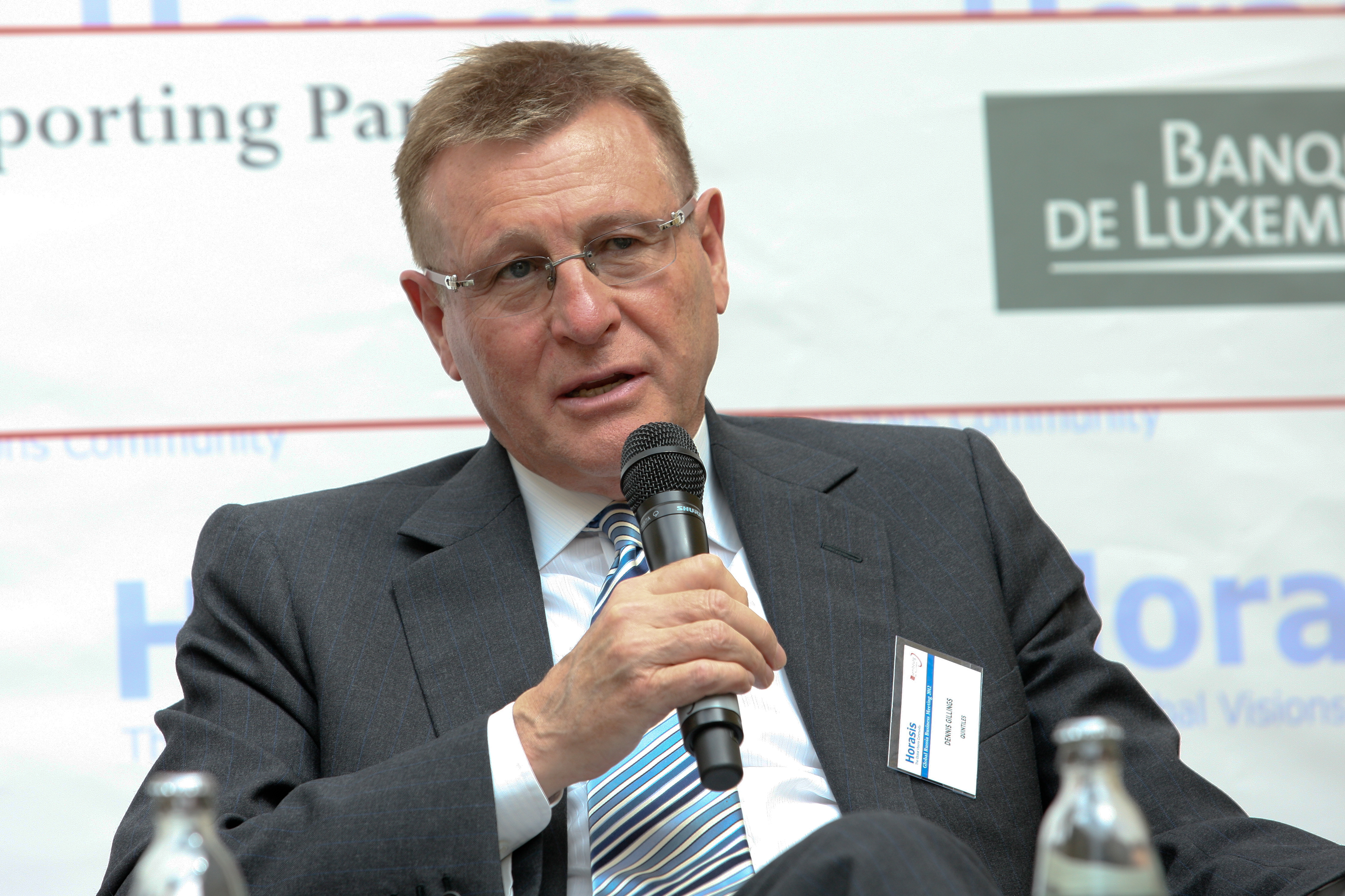
- Gillings in 2012
- Born: Dennis Barry Gillings; 25 April 1944 (age 82); London, United Kingdom
- Education: University of Exeter
- Occupations: Statistician and entrepreneur
- Known for: Founder and former chairman of Quintiles Transnational
- Spouse(s): Joan Gillings (m. 1978-2010; divorced); Mireille Gingras (m. 2012)

Sir Dennis Barry Gillings CBE (born 25 April 1944) is an USA-based British billionaire statistician and entrepreneur, the founder and former chairman of Quintiles Transnational, a clinical research company, headquartered in Durham, North Carolina.

== Early life ==
Gillings was born on 25 April 1944 in London, the son of a fishmonger. He earned a BSc degree in 1966 and a PhD in 1972, both in mathematics, from the University of Exeter. He also earned the equivalent of a master's degree in mathematical statistics from the University of Cambridge.

== Career ==
He returned to the University of Exeter, where he taught while earning his doctorate in mathematics. In 1971, Gillings accepted a position to teach biostatistics at the University of North Carolina at Chapel Hill.

Gillings is the founder and former chairman of Quintiles, a contract research organization. In 1994, he took Quintiles public through an IPO. Quintiles is the "largest global provider of clinical trials and commercial marketing services to the pharmaceutical and biotechnology industry". In December 2015, Gillings retired as executive chairman of Quintiles, but remains a director.

According to The Sunday Times Rich List in 2019 his net worth was estimated at £1.199 billion.

In 1998, he endowed the Dennis Gillings Professor of Health Management at the University of Cambridge.

== Honours ==
In 2001, he received an Honorary DSc degree from the University of Exeter. Gillings was appointed Commander of the Order of the British Empire (CBE) in 2004 for services to the pharmaceutical industry and was knighted in the 2020 New Year Honours for services to the advancement of dementia and life sciences research.

== Personal life ==
In 2010, Gillings filed for divorce from his first wife, Joan Gillings (1946-2021), shortly before their 32nd wedding anniversary. In 2012, he married Mireille Gingras in Hawaii.
