= Zerosumfree monoid =

Concept in abstract algebra

In abstract algebra, an additive monoid $(M, 0, +)$ is said to be zerosumfree, conical, centerless or positive if nonzero elements do not sum to zero. Formally, for all $a,b\in M$,
$$a + b = 0 \implies a = b = 0.$$

This means that the only way zero can be expressed as a sum is as $0 + 0$. This property defines one sense in which an additive monoid can be as unlike an additive group as possible: no elements have inverses.
