= Virtual group =

Virtual group may refer to:

- Virtual band in music
- Groupoid in category theory (an area of mathematics)
