= Magma (algebra) =

Algebraic structure with a binary operation

In abstract algebra, a magma, binar, or, rarely, groupoid is a basic kind of algebraic structure. Specifically, a magma consists of a set equipped with a single binary operation that must be closed by definition. No other properties are imposed.

== History and terminology ==
The term groupoid was introduced in 1927 by Heinrich Brandt describing his Brandt groupoid. The term was then appropriated by B. A. Hausmann and Øystein Ore (1937) in the sense (of a set with a binary operation) used in this article. In a couple of reviews of subsequent papers in Zentralblatt, Brandt strongly disagreed with this overloading of terminology. The Brandt groupoid is a groupoid in the sense used in category theory, but not in the sense used by Hausmann and Ore. Nevertheless, influential books in semigroup theory, including Clifford and Preston (1961) and Howie (1995) use groupoid in the sense of Hausmann and Ore. Hollings (2014) writes that the term groupoid is "perhaps most often used in modern mathematics" in the sense given to it in category theory.

According to Bergman and Hausknecht (1996): "There is no generally accepted word for a set with a not necessarily associative binary operation. The word groupoid is used by many universal algebraists, but workers in category theory and related areas object strongly to this usage because they use the same word to mean 'category in which all morphisms are invertible'. The term magma was used by Serre [Lie Algebras and Lie Groups, 1965]." It also appears in Bourbaki's Éléments de mathématique, Algèbre, chapitres 1 à 3, 1970.

== Definition ==
A magma is a set M with an operation • that sends any two elements a, b ∈ M to another element, a • b ∈ M. The symbol • is a general placeholder for a properly defined operation. This requirement that for all a, b in M, the result of the operation a • b also be in M, is known as the magma or closure property. In mathematical notation:

$$\forall a,b\colon a, b \in M \implies a \cdot b \in M.$$

If • is instead a partial operation, then (M, •) is called a partial magma or, more often, a partial groupoid.

== Morphism of magmas ==
A morphism of magmas is a function f : M → N that maps a magma (M, •) to a magma (N, ∗) and preserves the binary operation:

f (x • y) = f(x) ∗ f(y).

For example, with M equal to the positive real numbers and • as the geometric mean, N equal to the real number line, and ∗ as the arithmetic mean, a logarithm f is a morphism of the magma (M, •) to (N, ∗).

proof: $\log{\sqrt{x y} } \ = \ \frac{\log x + \log y}{2}.$

Note that these commutative magmas are not associative; nor do they have an identity element. This morphism of magmas has been used in economics since 1863 when William Stanley Jevons calculated the rate of inflation in 39 commodities in England in his A Serious Fall in the Value of Gold Ascertained.

== Notation and combinatorics ==
The magma operation may be applied repeatedly, and in the general, non-associative case, the order matters, which is notated with parentheses. Also, the operation • is often omitted and notated by juxtaposition:

(a • (b • c)) • d ≡ (a(bc))d.

A shorthand is often used to reduce the number of parentheses, in which the innermost operations and pairs of parentheses are omitted, being replaced just with juxtaposition: xy • z ≡ (x • y) • z. For example, the above is abbreviated to the following expression, still containing parentheses:

(a • bc)d.

A way to avoid completely the use of parentheses is prefix notation, in which the same expression would be written ••a•bcd. Another way, familiar to programmers, is reverse Polish notation, in which the same expression would be written abc••d•, in which the order of execution is simply left-to-right (no currying).

The set of all possible strings consisting of symbols denoting elements of the magma, and sets of balanced parentheses is called the Dyck language. The total number of different ways of writing n applications of the magma operator is given by the Catalan number C_{n}. Thus, for example, C_{2} = 2, which is just the statement that (ab)c and a(bc) are the only two ways of pairing three elements of a magma with two operations. Less trivially, C_{3} = 5: ((ab)c)d, (a(bc))d, (ab)(cd), a((bc)d), and a(b(cd)).

For an n-element set, there are n^{n^{2}} magmas associated with that set, so for n = 0, 1, 2, 3, 4, ..., there are 1, 1, 16, 19683, 4294967296, ... (sequence A002489 in the OEIS) magmas. The corresponding numbers of magmas up to isomorphism are 1, 1, 10, 3330, 178981952, ... (sequence A001329 in the OEIS) and the numbers of magmas up to isomorphism and antiisomorphism are 1, 1, 7, 1734, 89521056, ... (sequence A001424 in the OEIS).

== Free magma ==
A free magma $M_X$ on a set $X$ is the "most general possible" magma generated by $X$ (i.e., there are no relations or axioms imposed on the generators; see free object). The binary operation on $M_X$ is formed by wrapping each of the two operands in parentheses and juxtaposing them in the same order. For example

$$a\cdot b = (a)(b)$$,
$$a\cdot (a\cdot b) = (a)((a)(b))$$,
$$(a\cdot a)\cdot b = ((a)(a))(b)$$.

$M_X$ is essentially the set of non-associative words on $X$ with parentheses retained. It can also be viewed as the magma of full binary trees with leaves labelled by elements of $X$. The operation is that of joining trees at the root.

A free magma $M_X$ on a set $X$ has the universal property that if $f:X\to N$ is a function to any magma $N$, then there is a unique extension of $f$ to a morphism of magmas $f':M_X\to N$.

== Types of magma ==
Diagram showing the relationships between different algebraic structures

Magmas are not often studied as such; instead there are several different kinds of magma, depending on what axioms the operation is required to satisfy. Commonly studied types of magma include:

- Quasigroup: A magma where division is always possible.
  - Loop: A quasigroup with an identity element.
- Semigroup: A magma where the operation is associative.
  - Monoid: A semigroup with an identity element.
- Group: A magma with inverse, associativity, and an identity element.

Note that each of divisibility and invertibility imply the cancellation property.

Magmas with commutativity

- Commutative magma: A magma with commutativity.
- Commutative monoid: A monoid with commutativity.
- Abelian group: A group with commutativity.

== Classification by properties ==
Group-like structures
	Total	Associative	Identity	Divisible
Partial magma	Unneeded	Unneeded	Unneeded	Unneeded
Multiplicative	Unneeded	Unneeded	Required	Unneeded
Semigroupoid	Unneeded	Required	Unneeded	Unneeded
Small category	Unneeded	Required	Required	Unneeded
Groupoid	Unneeded	Required	Required	Required
Magma	Required	Unneeded	Unneeded	Unneeded
Quasigroup	Required	Unneeded	Unneeded	Required
Unital magma	Required	Unneeded	Required	Unneeded
Loop	Required	Unneeded	Required	Required
Semigroup	Required	Required	Unneeded	Unneeded
Associative quasigroup	Required	Required	Unneeded	Required
Monoid	Required	Required	Required	Unneeded
Group	Required	Required	Required	Required

A magma (S, •), with x, y, u, z ∈ S, is called

Medial
If it satisfies the identity xy • uz ≡ xu • yz
Left semimedial
If it satisfies the identity xx • yz ≡ xy • xz
Right semimedial
If it satisfies the identity yz • xx ≡ yx • zx
Semimedial
If it is both left and right semimedial
Left distributive
If it satisfies the identity x • yz ≡ xy • xz
Right distributive
If it satisfies the identity yz • x ≡ yx • zx
Autodistributive
If it is both left and right distributive
Commutative
If it satisfies the identity xy ≡ yx
Idempotent
If it satisfies the identity xx ≡ x
Unipotent
If it satisfies the identity xx ≡ yy
Zeropotent
If it satisfies the identities xx • y ≡ xx ≡ y • xx
Alternative
If it satisfies the identities xx • y ≡ x • xy and x • yy ≡ xy • y
Power-associative
If the submagma generated by any element is associative
Flexible
if xy • x ≡ x • yx
Associative
If it satisfies the identity x • yz ≡ xy • z, called a semigroup
A left unar
If it satisfies the identity xy ≡ xz
A right unar
If it satisfies the identity yx ≡ zx
Semigroup with zero multiplication, or null semigroup
If it satisfies the identity xy ≡ uv
Unital
If it has an identity element
Left-cancellative
If, for all x, y, z, relation xy = xz implies y = z
Right-cancellative
If, for all x, y, z, relation yx = zx implies y = z
Cancellative
If it is both right-cancellative and left-cancellative
A semigroup with left zeros
If it is a semigroup and it satisfies the identity xy ≡ x
A semigroup with right zeros
If it is a semigroup and it satisfies the identity yx ≡ x
Trimedial
If any triple of (not necessarily distinct) elements generates a medial submagma
Entropic
If it is a homomorphic image of a medial cancellation magma.
Central
If it satisfies the identity xy • yz ≡ y

== Number of magmas satisfying given properties ==
Idempotence	Commutative property	Associative property	Cancellation property	OEIS sequence (labeled)	OEIS sequence (isomorphism classes)
Unneeded	Unneeded	Unneeded	Unneeded	A002489	A001329
Required	Unneeded	Unneeded	Unneeded	A090588	A030247
Unneeded	Required	Unneeded	Unneeded	A023813	A001425
Unneeded	Unneeded	Required	Unneeded	A023814	A001423
Unneeded	Unneeded	Unneeded	Required	A002860 add a(0)=1	A057991
Required	Required	Unneeded	Unneeded	A076113	A030257
Required	Unneeded	Required	Unneeded		
Required	Unneeded	Unneeded	Required		
Unneeded	Required	Required	Unneeded	A023815	A001426
Unneeded	Required	Unneeded	Required		A057992
Unneeded	Unneeded	Required	Required	A034383 add a(0)=1	A000001 with a(0)=1 instead of 0
Required	Required	Required	Unneeded		
Required	Required	Unneeded	Required		a(n)=1 for n=0 and all odd n, a(n)=0 for all even n≥2
Required	Unneeded	Required	Required	a(0)=a(1)=1, a(n)=0 for all n≥2	a(0)=a(1)=1, a(n)=0 for all n≥2
Unneeded	Required	Required	Required	A034382 add a(0)=1	A000688 add a(0)=1
Required	Required	Required	Required	a(0)=a(1)=1, a(n)=0 for all n≥2	a(0)=a(1)=1, a(n)=0 for all n≥2

== Category of magmas ==
The category of magmas, denoted Mag, is the category whose objects are magmas and whose morphisms are magma homomorphisms. The category Mag has direct products, and there is an inclusion functor: Set ↪ Mag as trivial magmas, with operations given by projection x T y = y . More generally, because Mag is algebraic, it is a complete category.

An important property is that an injective endomorphism can be extended to an automorphism of a magma extension, just the colimit of the (constant sequence of the) endomorphism.

== See also ==
- Universal algebra
- Magma computer algebra system, named after the object of this article.
- Commutative magma
- Algebraic structures whose axioms are all identities
- Groupoid algebra
- Hall set
