= Semigroupoid =

Partial algebra

Group-like structures
	Total	Associative	Identity	Divisible
Partial magma	Unneeded	Unneeded	Unneeded	Unneeded
Multiplicative	Unneeded	Unneeded	Required	Unneeded
Semigroupoid	Unneeded	Required	Unneeded	Unneeded
Small category	Unneeded	Required	Required	Unneeded
Groupoid	Unneeded	Required	Required	Required
Magma	Required	Unneeded	Unneeded	Unneeded
Quasigroup	Required	Unneeded	Unneeded	Required
Unital magma	Required	Unneeded	Required	Unneeded
Loop	Required	Unneeded	Required	Required
Semigroup	Required	Required	Unneeded	Unneeded
Associative quasigroup	Required	Required	Unneeded	Required
Monoid	Required	Required	Required	Unneeded
Group	Required	Required	Required	Required

In mathematics, a semigroupoid (also called semicategory, naked category or precategory) is a partial algebra that satisfies the axioms for a small category, except possibly for the requirement that there be an identity at each object. While this definition is due to Tilson, Exel has introduced a different definition, one in which there is no underlying graph. The term semicategory usually refers to a Tilson's graphed semigroupoid. Semigroupoids generalise semigroups in the same way that small categories generalise monoids and groupoids generalise groups. Semigroupoids have applications in the structural theory of semigroups.

Formally, a semigroupoid consists of:

- a set of things called objects.
- for every two objects A and B a set Mor(A,B) of things called morphisms from A to B. If f is in Mor(A,B), we write f : A → B.
- for every three objects A, B and C a binary operation Mor(A,B) × Mor(B,C) → Mor(A,C) called composition of morphisms. The composition of f : A → B and g : B → C is written as g ∘ f or gf. (Some authors write it as fg.)

such that the following axiom holds:

- (associativity) if f : A → B, g : B → C and h : C → D then h ∘ (g ∘ f) = (h ∘ g) ∘ f.

== Examples ==
- The Yoneda lemma does not hold in general for semicategories.
