= Partial magma =

Partial magma may refer to:

- A partial groupoid
- Partially molten magma (liquid rock)
