= Partial group algebra =

In mathematics, a partial group algebra is an associative algebra related to the partial representations of a group.

== Examples ==
- The partial group algebra $\mathbb{C}_{\text{par}}(\mathbb{Z}_4)$ is isomorphic to the direct sum:
  $$\mathbb{C}\oplus\mathbb{C}\oplus\mathbb{C}\oplus\mathbb{C}\oplus\mathbb{C}\oplus\mathbb{C}\oplus\mathbb{C}\oplus \mathrm{M}_2 \mathbb{C} \oplus \mathrm{M}_3 \mathbb{C}$$

== See also ==
- Group ring
- Group representation
