= Commutative magma =

In mathematics, there exist magmas that are commutative but not associative. A simple example of such a magma may be derived from the children's game of rock, paper, scissors. Such magmas give rise to non-associative algebras.

A magma which is both commutative and associative is a commutative semigroup.

== Example: rock, paper, scissors ==
In the game of rock paper scissors, let $M := \{ r, p, s \}$ , standing for the "rock", "paper" and "scissors" gestures respectively, and consider the binary operation $\cdot : M \times M \to M$ derived from the rules of the game as follows:

For all $x, y \in M$:
- If $x \neq y$ and $x$ beats $y$ in the game, then $x \cdot y = y \cdot x = x$
- $x \cdot x = x$ I.e. every $x$ is idempotent.
So that for example:
- $r \cdot p = p \cdot r = p$ "paper beats rock";
- $s \cdot s = s$ "scissors tie with scissors".

This results in the Cayley table:

$$\begin{array}{c|ccc}
\cdot & r & p & s\\
\hline
r & r & p & r\\
p & p & p & s\\
s & r & s & s
\end{array}$$

By definition, the magma $(M, \cdot)$ is commutative, but it is also non-associative, as shown by:

$$r \cdot (p \cdot s) = r \cdot s = r$$

but

$$(r \cdot p) \cdot s = p \cdot s = s$$

i.e.

$$r \cdot (p \cdot s) \neq (r \cdot p) \cdot s$$

It is the simplest non-associative magma that is conservative, in the sense that the result of any magma operation is one of the two values given as arguments to the operation.

== Applications ==
The arithmetic mean, and generalized means of numbers or of higher-dimensional quantities, such as Frechet means, are often commutative but non-associative.

Commutative but non-associative magmas may be used to analyze genetic recombination.
