= Action groupoid =

In mathematics, an action groupoid (or transformation groupoid) is a groupoid that encodes a group action.

== Definition ==
Given any right group action

$$X \times G \to X,$$

its action groupoid is the small category defined as follows:

- the objects are elements of $X$,
- the morphisms from $x$ to $y$ are the elements of $X \times G$;
- the composition between $x \overset{g}\to y$ and $y \overset{h}\to z$ is $x \overset{hg}\to z$.

Since a groupoid is often depicted using two arrows, the action groupoid can be written as

$$X \times G \,\overset{s}\underset{t}\rightrightarrows\, X$$

where $s, t$ denote the source and the target of a morphism in $\mathcal{G}$; thus, $s(x, g) = x$ is the projection and $t(x, g) = xg$ is the given group action. Moreover

- the unit of $x \in M$ is $(x,e)$;
- the inverse of $(x,g)$ is $(xg,g^{-1})$.

The analogous definition can be given for left group actions.

== Properties ==
Several concepts related to a group action $X \times G \to X$ can be presented via its action groupoid $\mathcal{G}:= X \times G \rightrightarrows X$:

- the isotropy group $G_x := \{ g \in G \ | \ xg = x\} \subseteq G$ at $x \in X$ coincides with the isotropy group $\mathcal{G}_x := \mathcal{G}(x,x)$ of $\mathcal{G} \rightrightarrows X$ at $x \in X$;
- the orbit $\mathcal{O}_x = \{ y \in M \ | \ \exists g \in G \text{ with } y = xg \} \subseteq M$ of $x \in X$ coincides with the orbit $s(t^{-1}(x))$ of $\mathcal{G} \rightrightarrows X$ at $x \in X$;
- the orbit space $M/G$ of the group action coincides with the orbit space of $\mathcal{G} \rightrightarrows X$.

As a consequence, a group action is transitive if and only if its action groupoid is transitive.

=== Topological setting ===
If $G$ is a topological group and the $G$-action is a continuous group action, then its action groupoid $\mathcal{G}:= X \times G \rightrightarrows X$ is a topological groupoid. In such case

- the group action is proper if and only if $\mathcal{G} \rightrightarrows X$ is proper;
- $\mathcal{G} \rightrightarrows X$ is source $k$-connected if and only if $G$ is $k$-connected;

=== Smooth setting ===
If $G$ is a Lie group and the $G$-action is a Lie group action, then its action groupoid $\mathcal{G}:= X \times G \rightrightarrows X$ is a Lie groupoid. In such case

- $\mathcal{G} \rightrightarrows X$ is étale if and only if $G$ is discrete;
- $\mathcal{G} \rightrightarrows X$ is effective if the $G$-action is free and $G$ is discrete;
- if the group action is transitive, then $\mathcal{G} \rightrightarrows X$ is isomorphic to the gauge groupoid associated to the principal $G_x$-bundle $G \to \mathcal{O}_x = X$ (for any point $x \in X$).

The Lie algebroid of the action groupoid $\mathcal{G}:= X \times G \rightrightarrows X$ is the action algebroid associated to the infinitesimal action of the Lie algebra $\mathfrak{g} = \mathrm{Lie}(G)$ on $X$.

== In an ∞-category ==
Let $C$ be an ∞-category and $G$ a groupoid object in it. Then a group action or an action groupoid on an object $X$ in $C$ is the simplicial diagram

$$\cdots \, \underset{\rightrightarrows}\rightrightarrows \, X \times G \times G \, \underset{\rightarrow}\rightrightarrows \, X \times G \, \rightrightarrows\, X$$

that satisfies the axioms similar to an action groupoid in the usual case.
