= Effect algebra =

Mathematical model of quantum mechanics

Effect algebras are partial algebras which abstract the (partial) algebraic properties of events that can be observed in quantum mechanics. Structures equivalent to effect algebras were introduced by three different research groups in theoretical physics or mathematics in the late 1980s and early 1990s. Since then, their mathematical properties and physical as well as computational significance have been studied by researchers in theoretical physics, mathematics and computer science.

== History ==
In 1989, Roberto Giuntini and Greuling introduced structures for studying unsharp properties, meaning those quantum events whose probability of occurring is strictly between zero and one (and is thus not an either-or event). In 1994, Chovanec and Kôpka introduced D-posets as posets with a partially defined difference operation. In the same year, the paper by Bennet and Foulis Effect algebras and unsharp quantum logics was published. While it was this last paper that first used the term effect algebra, it was shown that all three structures are equivalent. The proof of isomorphism of categories of D-posets and effect algebras is given for instance by Dvurecenskij and Pulmannova.

== Motivation ==
The operational approach to quantum mechanics takes the set of observable (experimental) outcomes as the constitutive notion of a physical system. That is, a physical system is seen as a collection of events which may occur and thus have a measurable effect on the reality. Such events are called effects. This perspective already imposes some constrains on the mathematical structure describing the system: we need to be able to associate a probability to each effect.

In the Hilbert space formalism, effects correspond to positive semidefinite self-adjoint operators which lie below the identity operator in the following partial order: $A \leq B$ if and only if $B - A$ is positive semidefinite. The condition of being positive semidefinite guarantees that expectation values are non-negative, and being below the identity operator yields probabilities. Now we can define two operations on the Hilbert space effects: $A':= I - A$ and $A+B$ if $A+B\leq I$, where $I$ denotes the identity operator. Note that $A'$ is positive semidefinite and below $I$ since $A$ is, thus it is always defined. One can think of $A'$ as the negation of $A$. While $A+B$ is always positive semidefinite, it is not defined for all pairs: we have to restrict the domain of definition for those pairs of effects whose sum stays below the identity. Such pairs are called orthogonal; orthogonality reflects simultaneous measurability of observables.

== Definition ==
An effect algebra is a partial algebra consisting of a set $E$, constants $0$ and $1$ in $E$, a total unary operation $':E\rightarrow E$, a binary relation $\bot\subseteq E\times E$, and a binary operation $\oplus : \bot \rightarrow E$, such that the following hold for all $a,b,c\in E$:

- commutativity: if $a\perp b$, then $b\perp a$ and $a\oplus b=b\oplus a$,
- associativity: if $a\perp b$ and $(a\oplus b)\perp c$, then $b\perp c$ and $a\perp (b\oplus c)$ as well as $(a\oplus b)\oplus c = a\oplus (b\oplus c),$
- orthosupplementation: $a\perp a'$ and $a\oplus a'=1$, and if $a\perp b$ such that $a\oplus b=1$, then $b=a'$,
- zero-one law: if $a\perp 1$, then $a=0$.

The unary operation $'$ is called orthosupplementation and $a'$ the orthosupplement of $a$. The domain of definition $\bot$ of $\oplus$ is called the orthogonality relation on $E$, and $a,b\in E$ are called orthogonal if and only if $a\perp b$. The operation $\oplus$ is referred to as the orthogonal sum or simply the sum.

== Properties ==
The following can be shown for any elements $a,b$ and $c$ of an effect algebra, assuming $a\perp b,c$:

- $a''=a$,
- $0'=1$,
- $a\perp 0$, and $a\oplus 0=a$,
- $a\oplus b=0$ implies $a=b=0$,
- $a\oplus b = a\oplus c$ implies $b=c$.

=== Order properties ===
Every effect algebra $E$ is partially ordered as follows: $a\leq b$ if and only if there is a $c\in E$ such that $a\perp c$ and $a\oplus c = b$. This partial order satisfies:

- $a\leq b$ if and only if $b'\leq a'$,
- $a\perp b$ if and only if $a\leq b'$.

== Examples ==
=== Orthoalgebras ===
If the last axiom in the definition of an effect algebra is replaced by:

- if $a\perp a$, then $a=0$,

one obtains the definition of an orthoalgebra. Since this axiom implies the last axiom for effect algebras (in the presence of the other axioms), every orthoalgebra is an effect algebra. Examples of orthoalgebras (and hence of effect algebras) include:

- Boolean algebras with negation as orthosupplementation and the join restricted to disjoint elements as the sum,
- orthomodular posets,
- orthomodular lattices,
- σ-algebras with complementation as orthosupplementation and the union restricted to disjoint elements as the sum,
- Hilbert space projections with orthosupplementation and the sum defined as for the Hilbert space effects.

=== MV-algebras ===
Any MV-algebra is an effect algebra (but not, in general, an orthoalgebra) with the unary operation as orthosupplementation and the binary operation restricted to orthogonal elements as the sum. In the context of MV-algebras, orthogonality of a pair of elements $a,b$ is defined as $a'\oplus b'=1$. This coincides with orthogonality when an MV-algebra is viewed as an effect algebra.

An important example of an MV-algebra is the unit interval $[0,1]$ with operations $a'=1-a$ and $a\oplus b = \max(a+b,1)$. Seen as an effect algebra, two elements of the unit interval are orthogonal if and only if $a+b\leq 1$ and then $a\oplus b = a+b$.

=== The set of effects of a unital C*-algebra ===
Slightly generalising the motivating example of Hilbert space effects, take the set of effects on a unital C*-algebra $\mathfrak{A}$, i.e. the elements $a\in \mathfrak{A}$ satisfying $0\leq a \leq 1$. The addition operation on $a,b\in[0,1]_{\mathfrak{A}}$ is defined when $a+b\leq 1$ and then $a\oplus b = a+b$. The orthosupplementation is given by $a' = 1-a$.

== Types of effect algebras ==
There are various types of effect algebras that have been studied.

- Interval effect algebras that arise as an interval $[0,u]_G$ of some ordered Abelian group $G$.
- Convex effect algebras have an action of the real unit interval $[0,1]$ on the algebra. A representation theorem of Gudder shows that these all arise as an interval effect algebra of a real ordered vector space.
- Lattice effect algebras where the order structure forms a lattice.
- Effect algebras satisfying the Riesz decomposition property: an MV-algebra is precisely a lattice effect algebra with the Riesz decomposition property.
- Sequential effect algebras have an additional sequential product operation that models the Lüders product on a C*-algebra.
- Effect monoids are the monoids in the category of effect algebras. They are effect algebras that have an additional associative unital distributive multiplication operation.

== Morphisms ==
A morphism from an effect algebra $E$ to an effect algebra $F$ is given by a function $f:E\rightarrow F$ such that $f(1)=1$ and for all $a,b\in E$

$a\perp b$ implies $f(a)\perp f(b)$ and $f(a\oplus b) = f(a)\oplus f(b)$.

It then follows that morphisms preserve the orthosupplements.

Equipped with such morphisms, effect algebras form a category which has the following properties:

- the category of Boolean algebras is a full subcategory of the category of effect algebras,
- every effect algebra is a colimit of finite Boolean algebras.

=== Positive operator-valued measures ===
As an example of how effect algebras are used to express concepts in quantum theory, the definition of a positive operator-valued measure may be cast in terms of effect algebra morphisms as follows. Let $\mathcal E(H)$ be the algebra of effects of a Hilbert space $H$, and let $\Sigma$ be a σ-algebra. A positive operator-valued measure (POVM) is an effect algebra morphism $\Sigma\rightarrow\mathcal E(H)$ which preserves joins of countable chains. A POVM is a projection-valued measure precisely when its image is contained in the orthoalgebra of projections on the Hilbert space $H$.
