= Groupoid algebra =

In mathematics, the concept of groupoid algebra generalizes the notion of group algebra.

== Definition ==
Given a groupoid $(G, \cdot)$ (in the sense of a category with all morphisms invertible) and a field $K$, it is possible to define the groupoid algebra $KG$ as the algebra over $K$ formed by the vector space having the elements of (the morphisms of) $G$ as generators and having the multiplication of these elements defined by $g * h = g \cdot h$, whenever this product is defined, and $g * h = 0$ otherwise. The product is then extended by linearity.

== Examples ==
Some examples of groupoid algebras are the following:

- Group rings
- Matrix algebras
- Algebras of functions

== Properties ==
- When a groupoid has a finite number of objects and a finite number of morphisms, the groupoid algebra is a direct sum of tensor products of group algebras and matrix algebras.

== See also ==
- Hopf algebra
- Partial group algebra
