= Simplicial diagram =

In mathematics, especially algebraic topology, a simplicial diagram is a diagram indexed by the simplex category (= the category consisting of all $[n] = \{ 0, 1, \cdots n \}$ and the order-preserving functions).

Formally, a simplicial diagram in a category or an ∞-category C is a contraviant functor from the simplex category to C. Thus, it is the same thing as a simplicial object but is typically thought of as a sequence of objects in C that is depicted using multiple arrows

$$\cdots \, \underset{\rightrightarrows}\rightrightarrows \, U_2 \, \underset{\rightarrow}\rightrightarrows \, U_1 \, \rightrightarrows\, U_0$$

where $U_n$ is the image of $[n]$ from $\Delta$ in C.

A typical example is the Čech nerve of a map $U \to X$; i.e., $U_0 = U, U_1 = U \times_X U, \dots$. If F is a presheaf with values in an ∞-category and $U_{\bullet}$ a Čech nerve, then $F(U_{\bullet})$ is a cosimplicial diagram and saying $F$ is a sheaf exactly means that $F(X)$ is the limit of $F(U_{\bullet})$ for each $U \to X$ in a Grothendieck topology. See also: simplicial presheaf.

If $U_{\bullet}$ is a simplicial diagram, then the colimit

$$[U_{\bullet}] := \varinjlim_{[n] \in \Delta} U_n$$

is called the geometric realization of $U_{\bullet}$. For example, if $U_n = X \times G^n$ is an action groupoid, then the geometric realization in Grpd is the quotient groupoid $[X/G]$ which contains more information than the set-theoretic quotient $X/G$. A quotient stack is an instance of this construction (perhaps up to stackification).

The limit of a cosimplicial diagram is called the totalization of it.

== Augmented simplicial diagram ==
Sometimes one uses an augmented version of a simplicial diagram. Formally, an augmented simplicial diagram is a contravariant functor from the augmented simplex category $\Delta_{\textrm{aug}}$ where the objects are $[n] = \{ 0, 1, \dots, n \}, \, n \ge -1$ and the morphisms order-preserving functions.
