= Partial algebra =

Algebraic structure

In abstract algebra, a partial algebra is a pair <A, P> where A is a set and P is a collection of partial operations on A. In universal algebra, when P consists of operations that are defined on all arguments taken from A, then the algebra is a total algebra. Frequently the adjective total is omitted when there are no partial operations.

As a motivation for the study of partial algebras, George Grätzer considered the case of "subsets of an algebra and properties of operations on these subsets, even if the subsets are not closed under all operations."

== Example(s) ==
- partial groupoid
- field — the multiplicative inversion is the only proper partial operation
- effect algebras

== Structure ==
There is a "Meta Birkhoff Theorem" by Andreka, Nemeti and Sain (1982).

=== Relational systems ===
Operations and partial operations may be written as finitary relations, where there is no requirement of totality. "A relational system $\mathfrak{A}$ is a pair <A, R>, where A is a non-void set and R is a family of (finitary) relations on A."

"Since an n-ary operation is a special case of an (n+1)-ary relation, we see that algebras may be regarded as a special case of relational structures."

Though relational systems have greater generality than algebras and partial algebras, they do not have the rich theory of the algebras. For example, defining a subalgebra of a relational system is not straight forward.
