= Partial groupoid =

Set endowed with a partial binary operation

Group-like structures
	Total	Associative	Identity	Divisible
Partial magma	Unneeded	Unneeded	Unneeded	Unneeded
Semigroupoid	Unneeded	Required	Unneeded	Unneeded
Small category	Unneeded	Required	Required	Unneeded
Groupoid	Unneeded	Required	Required	Required
Magma	Required	Unneeded	Unneeded	Unneeded
Quasigroup	Required	Unneeded	Unneeded	Required
Unital magma	Required	Unneeded	Required	Unneeded
Loop	Required	Unneeded	Required	Required
Semigroup	Required	Required	Unneeded	Unneeded
Associative quasigroup	Required	Required	Unneeded	Required
Monoid	Required	Required	Required	Unneeded
Group	Required	Required	Required	Required

In abstract algebra, a partial groupoid (also called halfgroupoid, pargoid, or partial magma) is a set endowed with a partial binary operation.

A partial groupoid is a partial algebra.

== Partial semigroup ==
A partial groupoid $(G,\circ)$ is called a partial semigroup if the following associative law holds:

For all $x,y,z \in G$ such that $x\circ y\in G$ and $y\circ z\in G$, the following two statements hold:

1. $x \circ (y \circ z) \in G$ if and only if $( x \circ y) \circ z \in G$, and
2. $x \circ (y \circ z ) = ( x \circ y) \circ z$ if $x \circ (y \circ z) \in G$ (and, because of 1., also $( x \circ y) \circ z \in G$).
