= Hyperoctahedral group =

Group of symmetries of an n-dimensional hypercube

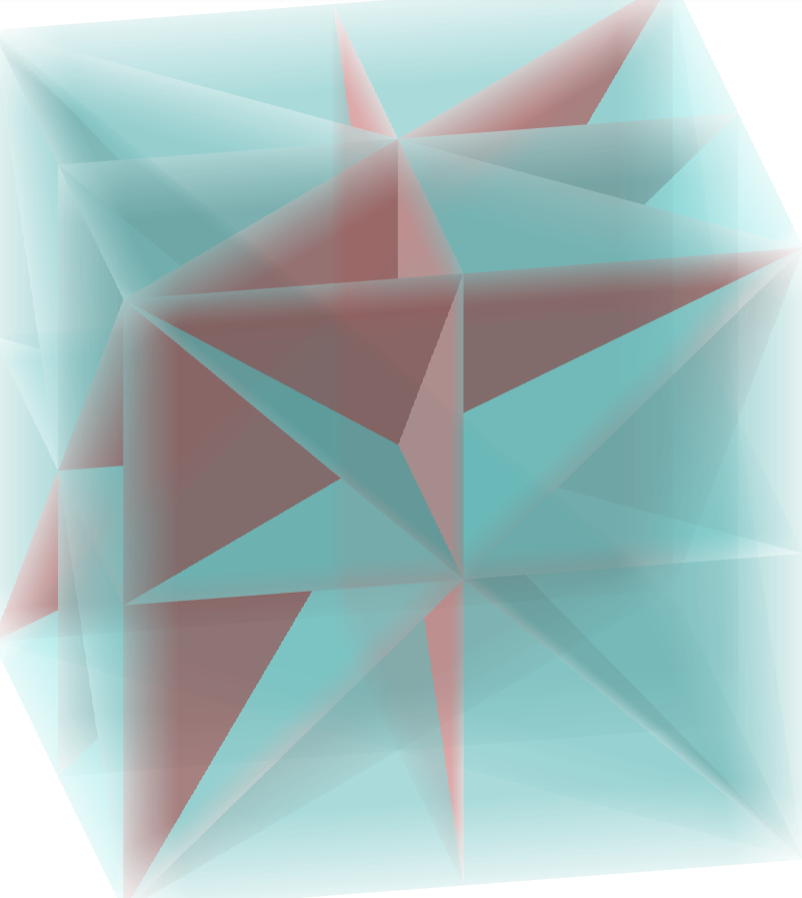
The nine symmetry planes of a cube

The two-dimensional square and the three-dimensional cube belong to a family of highly symmetric polyhedra (the hypercubes). For each dimension n, the nth hyperoctahedral group is the mathematical object whose elements are the symmetry transformations of the n-dimensional hypercube.

Each hyperoctahedral group also arises as the symmetry group of other polyhedra, including the regular octahedron and its higher-dimensional counterparts, the cross-polytopes. In addition to their role in geometry, the hyperoctahedral groups also appear in other areas of mathematics. Algebraically, the nth hyperoctahedral group may be represented as the set of n × n signed permutation matrices: these are the invertible matrices with entries only 0, 1, or −1 and with exactly one non-zero entry in each row or column. In combinatorics, they may be viewed as a signed version of the symmetric groups, with their elements given by signed permutations, or modeled by rearrangements of a deck of n cards that may be shuffled and also flipped face up or face down.

As a group, the nth hyperoctahedral group has the structure of a wreath product $C_2 \wr S_n$ of the two-element group $C_2$ with the symmetric group $S_n$. Many of its algebraic, geometric, and combinatorial properties are closely related to those of the symmetric group, and may be generalized to the generalized symmetric group $C_r \wr S_n$. The hyperoctahedral groups are finite Coxeter groups. As a result, they are closely connected to a number of other mathematical objects in Lie theory, where they arise as the Weyl groups associated to the symplectic groups and the orthogonal groups and their associated Lie algebras. The family of hyperoctahedral groups forms type B in the classification of finite Coxeter groups.

The hyperoctahedral groups were named by Alfred Young in 1930.

== Low-dimensional examples ==
The hyperoctahedral group in dimension 1 is the group of symmetries of a line segment. This is a two-element group, consisting of the identity element and a single other element. In higher dimensions, hyperoctahedral groups have richer structure.

=== Dimension 2: symmetries of a square ===
The hyperoctahedral group in two dimensions is the dihedral group of order 8, the symmetry group of a square. It has eight elements, of which four are rotations (including the identity, a rotation by an angle of 0°) and four are reflections. The group operation is functional composition; for example, first reflecting the square across the horizontal axis, then reflecting it across the diagonal of slope 1 gives the same result as rotating the square by 90° counter-clockwise, so in the group the product of these two reflections is that rotation.

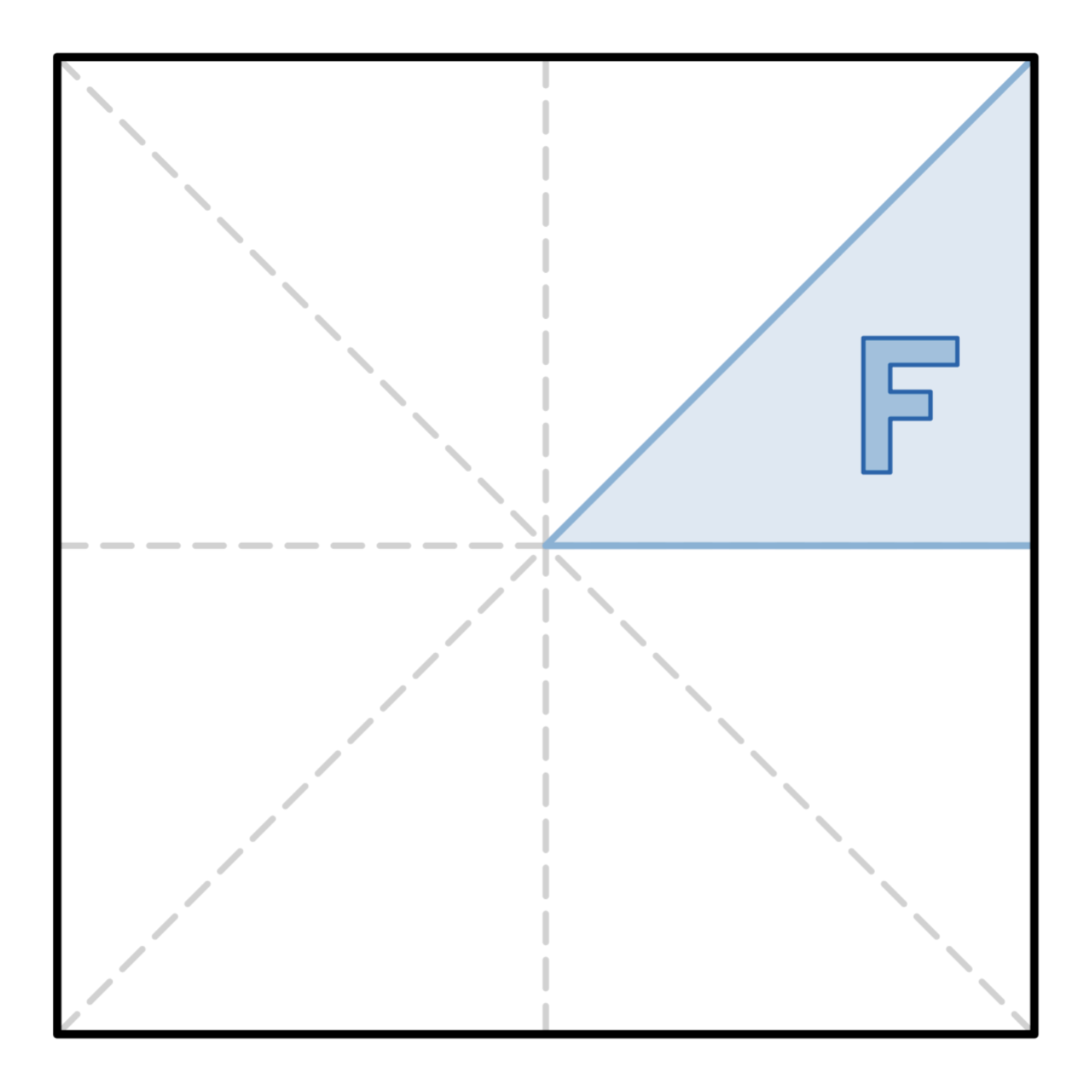
The square's initial position (the identity transformation)

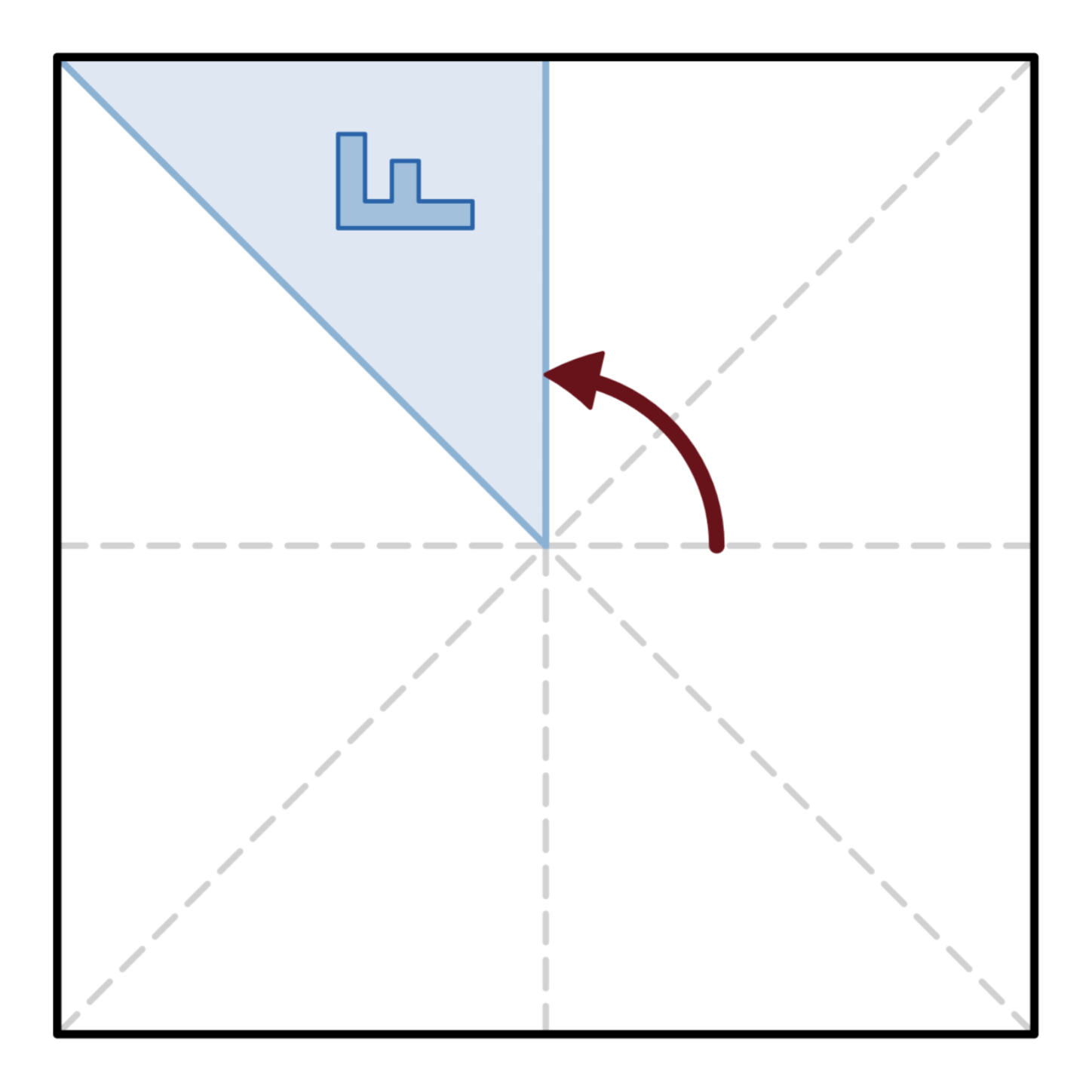
Rotation by 90° anticlockwise

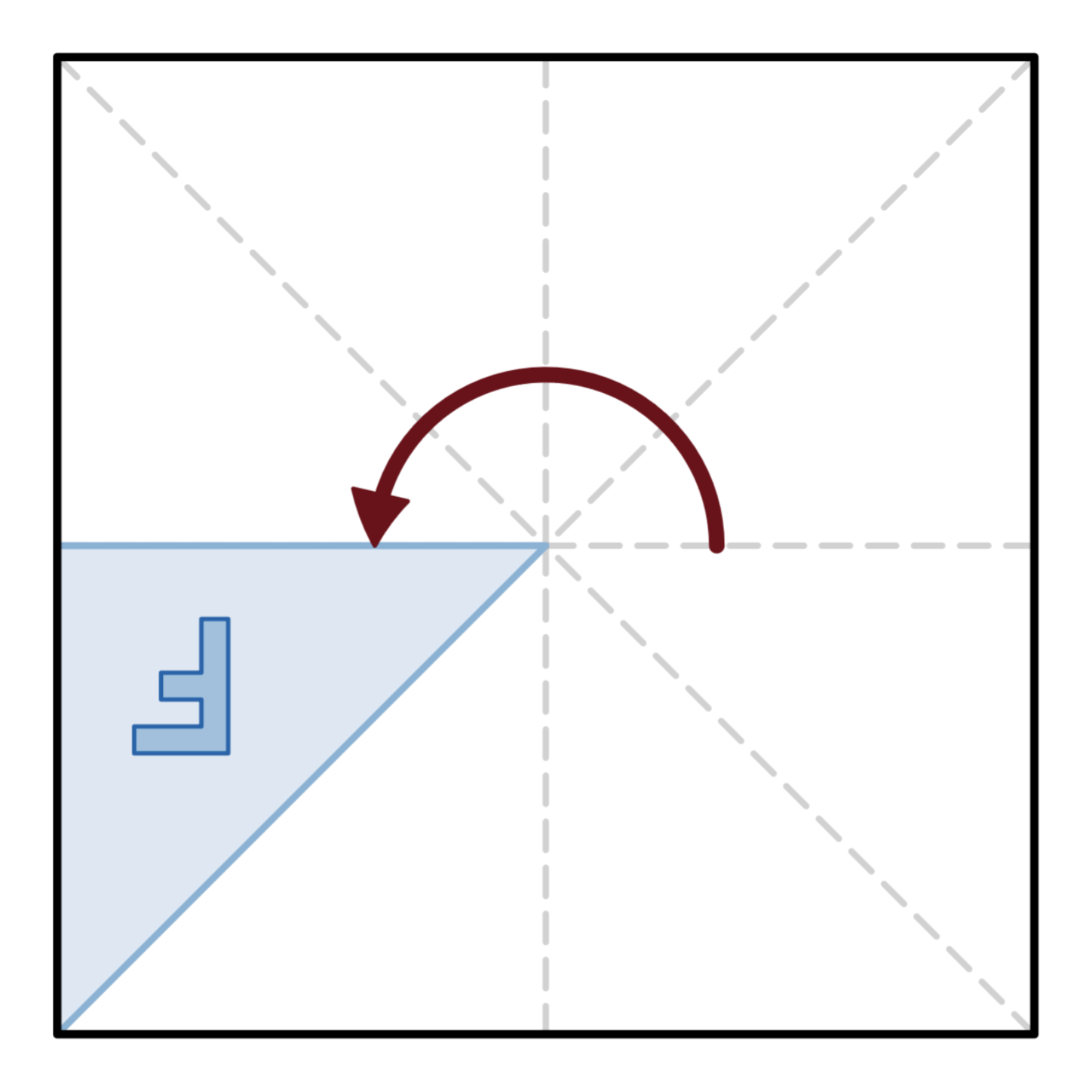
Rotation by 180°

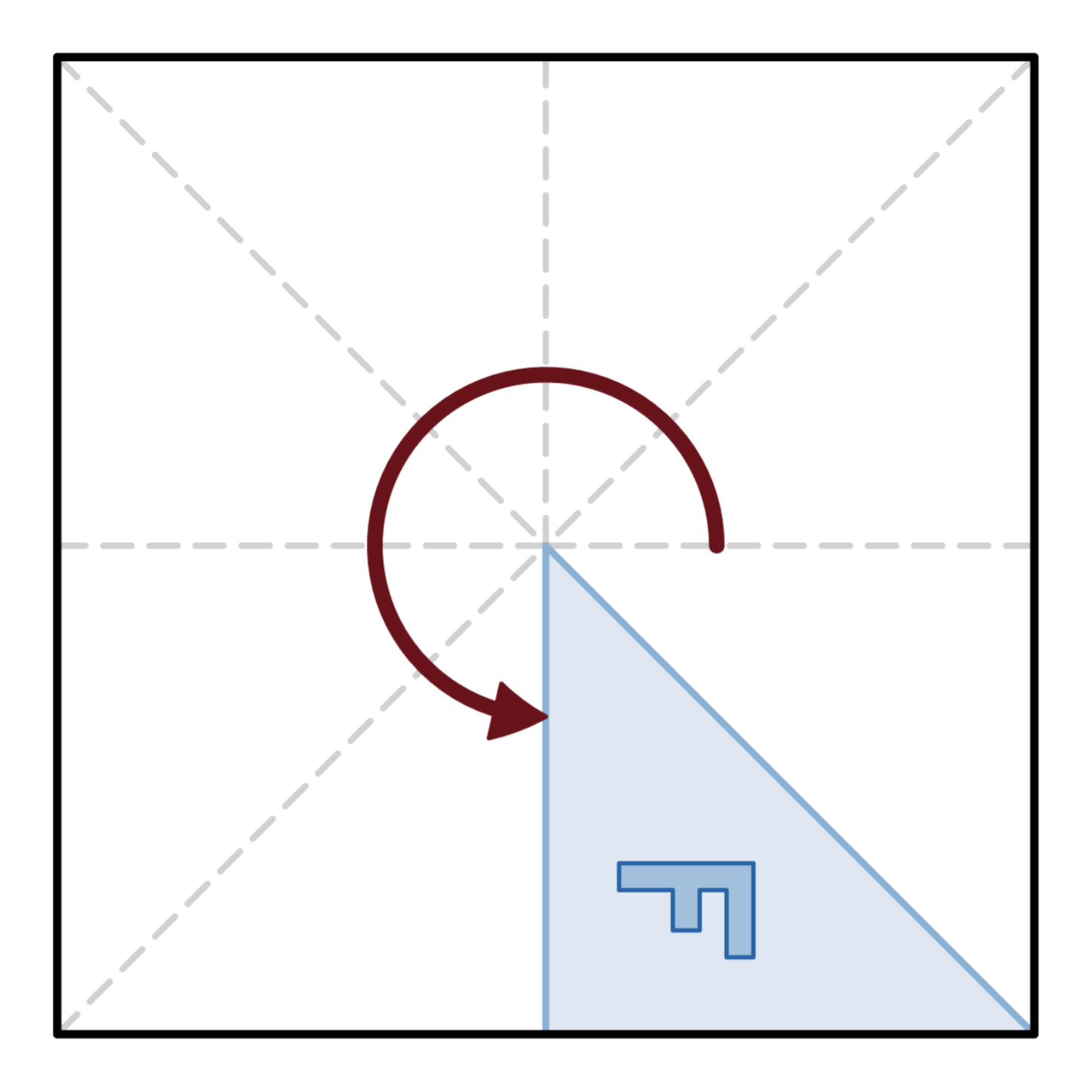
Rotation by 270°

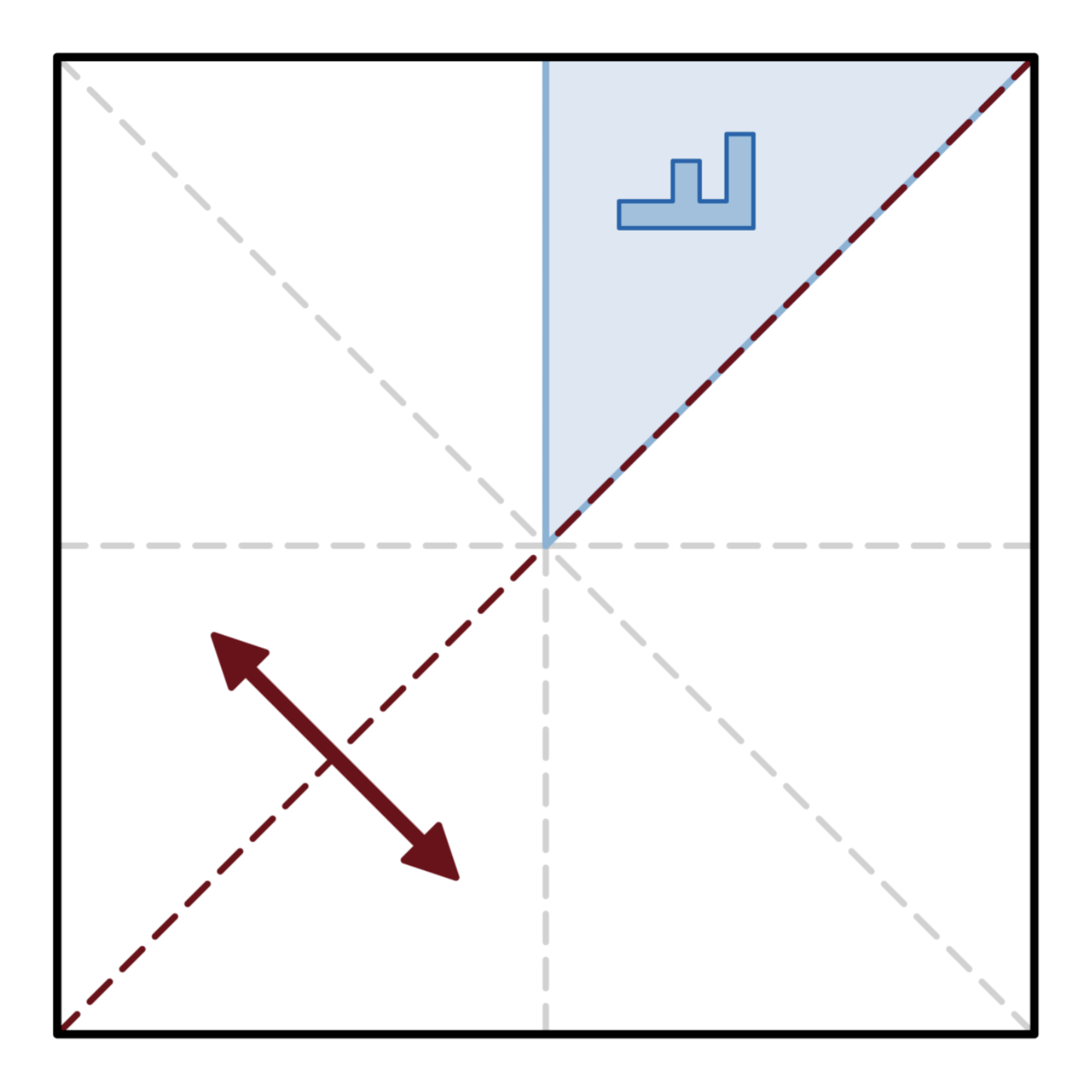
Diagonal NW–SE reflection

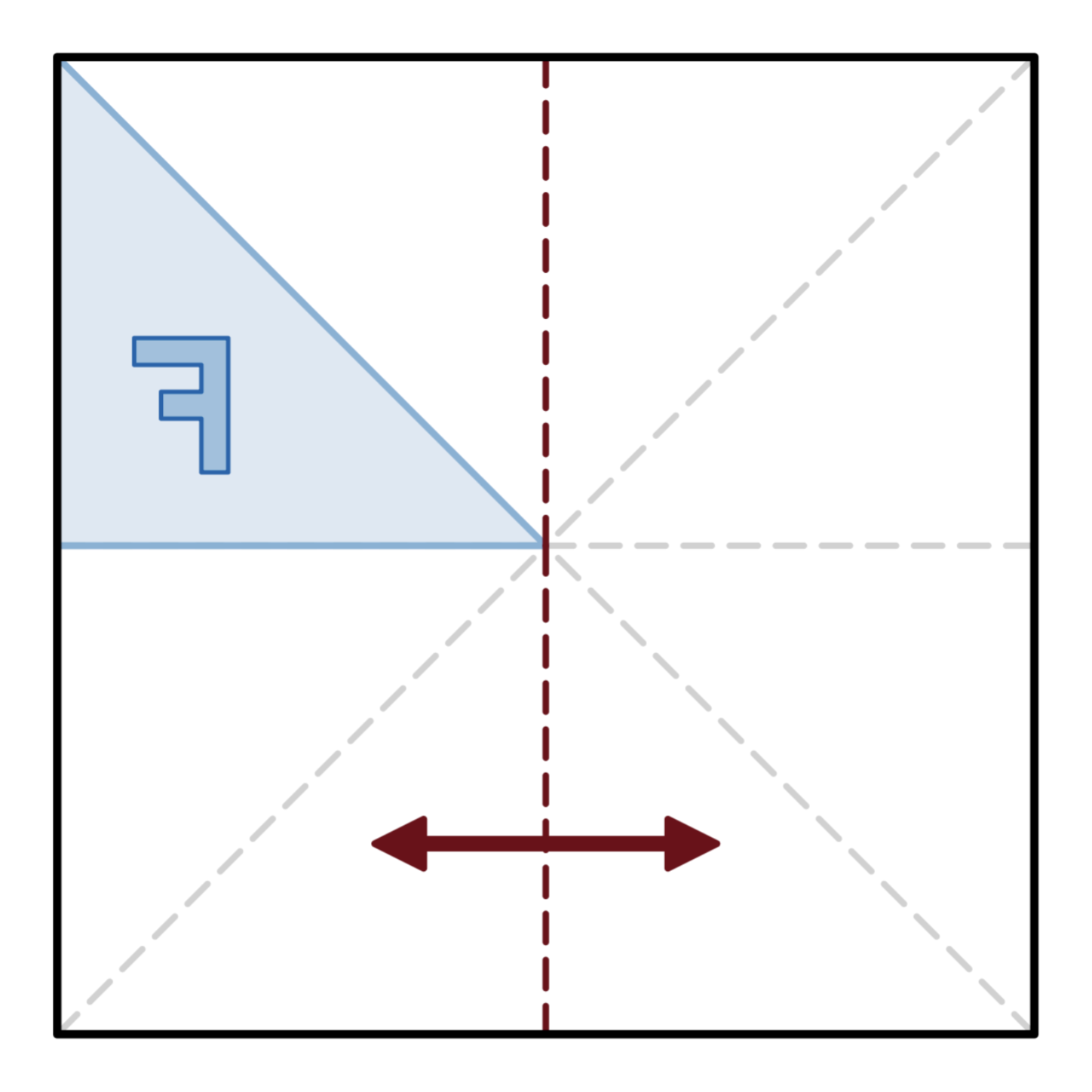
Horizontal reflection

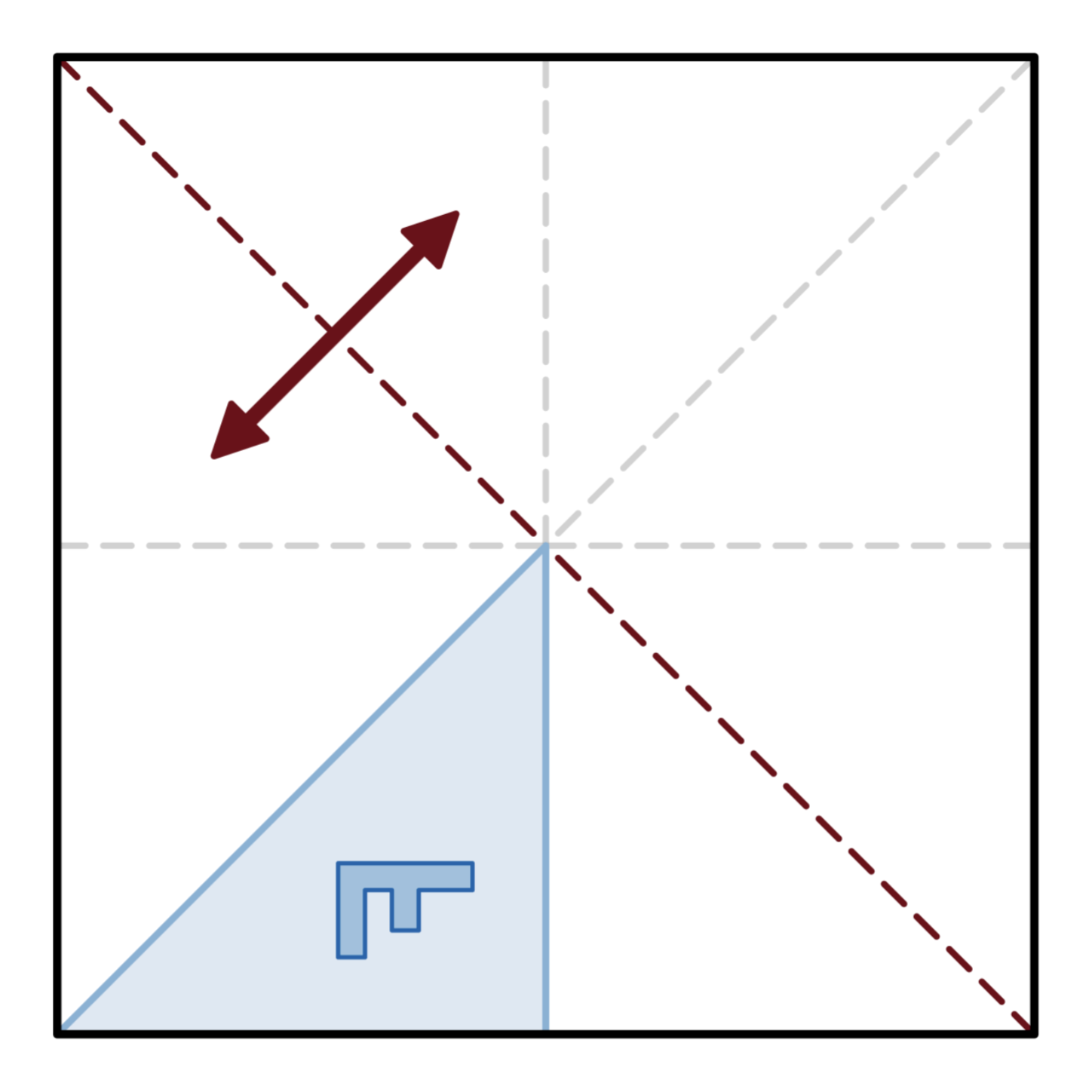
Diagonal NE–SW reflection

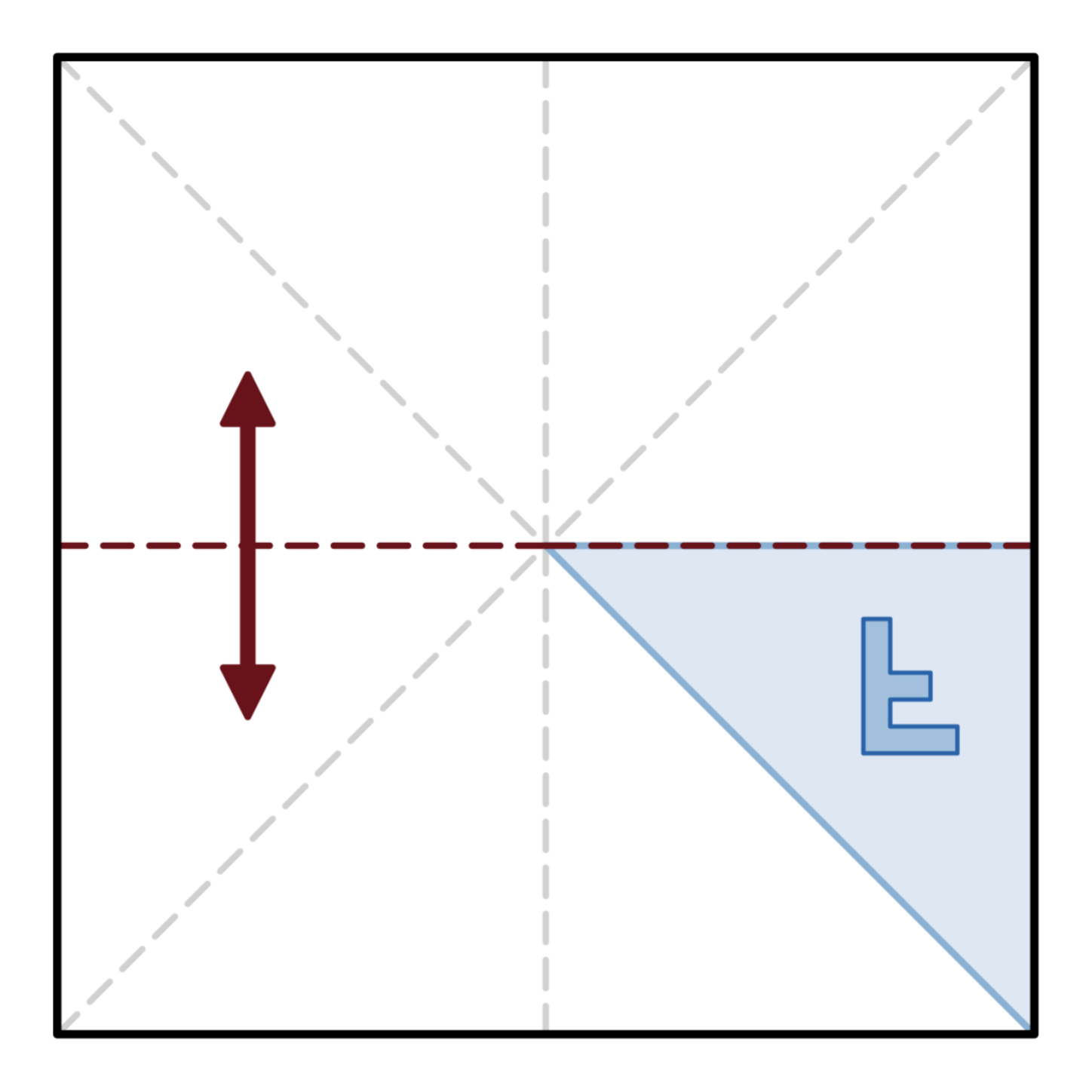
Vertical reflection

The group can be characterized by generators and relations in several ways. One such expression is $\langle r, s \mid r^4 = s^2 = 1, srs = r^{-1} \rangle$, where 1 represents the identity transformation, r represents the rotation by 90° (of order 4), s represents any of the reflections (of order 2), and the final relation captures the fact that reflecting across a line, then rotating by 90° counter-clockwise, then reflecting across the same line has the same effect as applying a single rotation by 90° clockwise.

A separate presentation of the group is $\langle s, t \mid s^2 = t^2 = (st)^4 = 1 \rangle$. In this presentation, s and t represent two reflections, one across a diagonal and one across a line through the centers of two opposite sides. Then the product st is a rotation by 90°, of order 4.

=== Dimension 3: symmetries of a cube ===
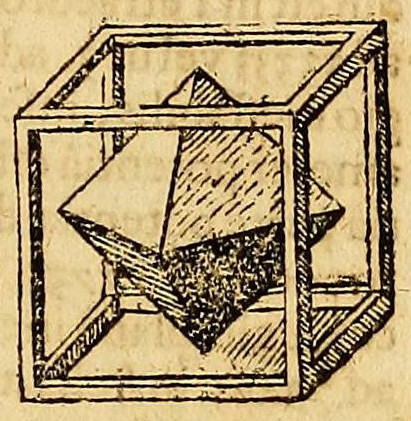
The cube and the regular octahedron are dual polyhedra, with the same group of symmetries; illustration from Harmonice Mundi by Johannes Kepler (1619).

Because the cube and regular octahedron are dual polyhedra, they have the same symmetry group. This group consists of 48 = 8·3! elements: each symmetry is determined by picking a vertex of the cube, choosing the position of one of eight vertices to send it to, and choosing how its neighbors are assigned in one of 3! = 6 ways.

Of the 48 symmetries, several families are of note. Twenty-three of the symmetries are nontrivial rotations:

- nine are rotations around one of the lines that passes through the centers of two opposite faces (one each by 90°, 180°, and 270° around the three axes),
- six are rotations by 180° around a line through the midpoints of two opposite edges, and
- eight are rotations around one of the space diagonals (one each by 120° and 240° around the four diagonals).

Along with the identity, these form the rotational subgroup of the cube. This subgroup is isomorphic to the symmetric group $S_4$ of permutations of a four-element set; for example, one can show that each permutation of the four space diagonals can be achieved by exactly one rotational symmetry.

Aside from the rotations, nine of the symmetries of the cube are reflections across a plane: three reflections across planes parallel to a pair of opposite faces, and six further reflections across the planes that pass through two opposite edges of the cube. The remaining symmetries include the point reflection through the center of the cube that sends each vertex to the opposite vertex, and various improper rotations (a combination of a rotation about an axis and a reflection in a plane perpendicular to that axis) of orders 4 and 6.

If one chooses a Cartesian coordinate system so that the origin is at the center of the cube and the three coordinate axes are parallel to the edges, then the choice of where to send the single vertex can be achieved by reflections across the three coordinate planes; because these different reflections commute, these form a subgroup of the form $C_2 \times C_2 \times C_2$, a direct product of three two-element groups. The rearrangements of the three neighbor vertices are given by a subgroup isomorphic to the symmetric group $S_3$ of permutations of a three-element set. Thus, the whole group of symmetries of the cube can be written as a semidirect product $(C_2 \times C_2 \times C_2) \rtimes S_3$. The same group can also be written as the direct product $C_2 \times S_4$ of the rotational subgroup of the cube by the two-element group generated by the point reflection through the origin.

If one divides the cube into chambers by the planes fixed by each of its reflection symmetries, each chamber is bounded by three such planes. Calling the reflections across these planes $s_0, s_1, s_2$, one can show that these form a generating set for all of the symmetries (that is, every other symmetry can be achieved by repeated compositions of these three symmetries), subject to the relations that $s_0^2$, $s_1^2$, $s_2^2$, $(s_0s_2)^2$, $(s_1s_2)^3$, and $(s_0s_1)^4$ are all the identity transformation.

== In arbitrary dimension ==
For any positive integer n, the n-dimensional Euclidean space $\R^n$ contains n-dimensional analogues of the cube, called hypercubes. One such hypercube $\mathcal{H}$ consists of all the points $(x_1, \ldots, x_n)$ such that $|x_i| \leq 1$ for $i = 1, \ldots, n$, with vertices $(\pm 1, \ldots, \pm 1)$. The hyperoctahedral group consists of all rigid transformations w of $\R^n$ that send $\mathcal{H}$ to itself: $w(\mathcal{H}) = \mathcal{H}$. Equivalently, one may consider the dual polytope of $\mathcal{H}$; this is the n-dimensional cross-polytope $\mathcal{O}$. It consists of all points in $\R^n$ that satisfy the equation $|x_1| + \ldots + |x_n| \leq 1$, and has as vertices the vectors $\pm e_1, \ldots, \pm e_n$, where $e_i = (0, \ldots, 0, 1, 0, \ldots, 0)$ is the standard basis vector of $\R^n$ having ith entry equal to 1 and all other entries equal to 0.

The rigid transformations of $\R^n$ that preserve the cross-polytope $\mathcal{O}$ (equivalently, the hypercube $\mathcal{H}$) are all linear transformations. In the standard basis for $\R^n$, the matrix of such a transformation must be a signed permutation matrix: it must have exactly one nonzero entry in each row and column, and the nonzero entries are all ±1. (Note: In other words, it must be a monomial matrix whose nonzero entries are all ±1.) Thus the hyperoctahedral group $S^{\pm}_n$ of dimension n may be characterized as the group of n × n signed permutation matrices under the operation of matrix multiplication. Combinatorially, the elements may be represented as signed permutations, that is, as n-tuples $[w(1), w(2), \dots, w(n)]$ that contain exactly one element from each of the n sets {1, −1}, {2, −2}, ..., {n, −n}.

Algebraically, $S^{\pm}_n$ is isomorphic to the wreath product $C_2 \wr S_n$ of the two-element group $C_2 = \{+1, -1\}$ by the symmetric group $S_n$. That is, it is a semidirect product $C_2^n \rtimes S_n$ of a direct product $C_2^n = C_2 \times \cdots \times C_2$ of n copies of $C_2$ with the symmetric group: the normal subgroup $C_2^n$ acts by sign changes, while the symmetric group $S_n$ acts by permuting coordinates.

From these characterizations, one can see that the size of the hyperoctahedral group is $2^n n!$, since there are $n!$ (the factorial of n) ways to choose the positions of the nonzero entries (a permutation of the coordinate axes) and $2^n$ ways to choose whether each one should be positive or negative.

== As a reflection, Coxeter, and Weyl group ==
A reflection in Euclidean space $\R^n$ is a linear operator $t: \R^n \to \R^n$ for which there is a hyperplane H (that is, a subspace of dimension n − 1) that t fixes pointwise (that is, such that $t(x) = x$ for all x in H) and such that t negates the vectors in the line perpendicular to H. A finite group W of invertible linear operators on $\R^n$ is called a (finite real) reflection group if W is generated by the reflections it contains. The hyperoctahedral group is a reflection group in this sense: the subgroup $C_2^n$ is generated by the n sign changes, each of which fixes a coordinate hyperplane $\{(x_1, \ldots, x_n) : x_i = 0\}$ pointwise while negating the normal vector $e_i$, and the subgroup $S_n$ is generated by its subset of transpositions, and the transposition $(i \ j)$ fixes the hyperplane $\{(x_1, \ldots, x_n) : x_i = x_j\}$ pointwise while negating its normal vector $e_i - e_j$. Since $S^{\pm}_n$ is the product of these two subgroups, it is generated by the collection of both types of reflections.

For every finite real reflection group acting on a space of dimension n, there is a standard procedure to produce a set of n reflections that generate the group, subject to a simple collection of relations. The reflecting hyperplanes of the reflections divide space into a collection of regions called chambers. Each chamber has n of the hyperplanes in its boundary, and the reflections across these planes form a generating set for the group.

In the case of the hyperoctahedral group, one such choice produces the reflections $s_0, s_1, \ldots, s_{n - 1}$ whose action on $\R^n$ is given as follows: for any point $x = (x_1, \ldots, x_n)$ in $\R^n$,
$$s_0(x) = (-x_1, x_2, \ldots, x_n)$$
and
$$s_i(x) = (x_1, x_2, \ldots, x_{i - 1}, x_{i + 1}, x_i, x_{i + 2}, x_{i + 3}, \ldots, x_n)$$
for $i = 1, \ldots, n - 1$. That is, $s_0$ acts by negating the first coordinate, and $s_i$ acts by transposing the ith and (i + 1)st coordinates for $i = 1, \ldots, n - 1$. (Note: This is not the only possible choice of simple system; for example, Kane (2001, p. 37) and Humphreys (1990, p. 42) take a system of generators corresponding to the reflections $s_1, \ldots, s_{n - 1}, s_n$ where $s_n(x) = (x_1, \ldots, x_{n - 1}, -x_n)$.)

One can check that these reflections generate $S^{\pm}_n$ and that they satisfy the relations
$$(s_0s_1)^4 = 1, \quad (s_is_{i + 1})^3 = 1, \quad \text{and } (s_i s_j)^2 = 1$$
if $|i - j| > 1$. In fact, one can show further that these are a complete set of relations; that is, that $S^{\pm}_n$ is the group with presentation
$$\left\langle s_0, s_1, \ldots, s_{n - 1} \mid (s_i)^2 = 1, (s_0s_1)^4 = 1, (s_is_{i + 1})^3 = 1 \text{ for } i = 1, \ldots, n - 1, \text{ and } (s_is_j)^2 = 1 \text{ if } |i - j| > 1 \right\rangle.$$
This gives $S^{\pm}_n$ the structure of a Coxeter group, with $S = \{s_0, \ldots, s_{n - 1}\}$ the corresponding set of simple reflections. The corresponding Coxeter–Dynkin diagram recording these relations is the diagram

B_{n} : ...

with n nodes.

=== As a Weyl group of a root system ===
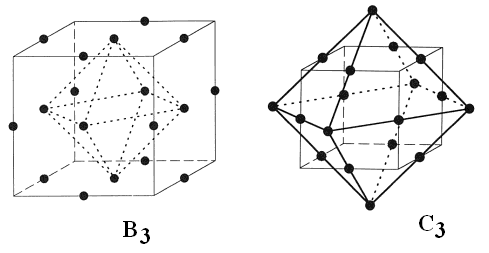
The root systems of types B_{3} and C_{3}. Only the tip of each vector is drawn; the origin is at the center of the cube/octahedron.

The hyperoctahedral group arises as the symmetries of other geometric objects aside from polyhedra. A root system Φ is a finite set of nonzero vectors (called roots) in Euclidean space that satisfy two properties: if α belongs to Φ then the scalar multiple cα belongs to Φ only for $c = \pm 1$, and if α and β belong to Φ then so does the reflection of β across the hyperplane orthogonal to α. Each root system determines a finite real reflection group, generated by the reflections through the planes orthogonal to its roots.

A root system is crystallographic if its roots span a lattice, (Note: Equivalently, one can ask that the ratios $\frac{2 (\alpha, \beta)}{(\beta, \beta)}$ are integers for all pairs of roots α and β, where ( - , - ) is the standard inner product.) and in this case the associated finite reflection group is called a Weyl group. For $n \geq 3$ there are, up to isomorphism, two crystallographic root systems whose associated Weyl group is $S^{\pm}_n$: letting $e_1, \ldots, e_n$ be the standard basis for $\R^n$, the type B root system $\Phi_{\mathrm{B}}$ consists of the vectors
$$\Phi_{\mathrm{B}} = \{e_1, \ldots, e_n\} \bigcup \{\pm e_i \pm e_j : 1 \leq i < j \leq n\}$$
whereas the type C root system $\Phi_{\mathrm{C}}$ is the following minor variant:
$$\Phi_{\mathrm{C}} = \{2e_1, \ldots, 2e_n\} \bigcup \{\pm e_i \pm e_j : 1 \leq i < j \leq n\}.$$
The root $e_i$ (or $2e_i$) corresponds to the reflection that, when acting on a vector $(x_1, \ldots, x_n)$ in $\R^n$, changes the sign of the ith coordinate. The root $e_i - e_j$ corresponds to the reflection that swaps the ith and jth coordinates, while the root $e_i + e_j$ corresponds to the reflection that swaps the ith and jth coordinates and changes both of their signs.

In the case n = 2, these root systems are isomorphic, and both give the group $S^{\pm}_2 \cong D_{2 \times 4}$. For general n, the two root systems are not isomorphic, but they are dual to each other. (Note: The dual or inverse of a crystallographic root system Φ consists of all vectors of the form $\frac{2\alpha}{\|\alpha\|^2}$ where α is a root in Φ.) For n = 3, the type B root system consists of the vectors from the center of a cube to the centers of its edges and faces, while the type C root system consists of the vectors from the center of an octahedron to its vertices and the centers of its edges.

== As a permutation group ==
The hyperoctahedral group $S^\pm_n$ can be identified with the set of bijections w from the set $\{-n, -n + 1, \ldots, -1, 1, 2, \ldots, n\}$ to itself that satisfy $w(-i) = -w(i)$ for all i in $\{-n, -n + 1, \ldots, -1, 1, 2, \ldots, n\}$, under the operation of functional composition. (Note: Less concretely, for any set X of size 2n, partitioned into n disjoint pairs, the group of permutations of X that respect the decomposition is isomorphic to $S^\pm_n$.) The bijection w is determined by the signed permutation $[w(1), w(2), \ldots, w(n)]$, which in this context is called the window notation of w.

The representation of $S^\pm_n$ as a group of permutations of a set of size 2n induces a natural inclusion map $\iota: S^{\pm}_n \to S_{2n}$ from the n-dimensional hyperoctahedral group into the symmetric group on twice as many elements. The image of $\iota$ is the set of permutations in $S_{2n}$ whose permutation matrix is fixed by 180° rotation around its center. Equivalently, writing $w_0$ for the permutation in $S_{2n}$ whose one-line notation is $(2n, 2n-1, \ldots, 2, 1)$ and whose cycle notation is $(1 \ 2n)(2 \ 2n-1) \cdots (n \ n + 1)$, the image of $\iota$ is the set of permutations $g$ that satisfy $w_0 g w_0 = g$, and also the set of permutations that commute with $w_0$.

One may alternatively consider the group of bijections from the set $[-n, n] \cap \Z = \{-n, -n + 1, \ldots, n - 1, n\}$ to itself that satisfy $w(-i) = -w(i)$ for all i, since the symmetry condition enforces $w(0) = 0$. In this case the associated inclusion map is into the symmetric group $S_{2n+1}$.

== Cycles and conjugacy classes ==
When viewed as a signed permutation in window notation, a cycle of an element w of $S^\pm_n$ is a cycle in the underlying permutation that we get by erasing all minus signs; the length of the cycle is the number of entries it contains. A cycle is positive if the number of negative numbers among its entries in the window is even, and negative otherwise. (Note: Other terminology in the literature includes "balanced" (Chen & Stanley 1993), "even" (Reiner 1993), and "paired" (Kallipoliti 2011) in place of "positive".) When viewed as a permutation of $\{-n, \ldots, -1, 1, \ldots, n\}$, each positive cycle corresponds to two cycles, one containing the negatives of the entries of the other, while each negative cycle corresponds to a single cycle that contains i if and only if it contains −i. For example, the signed permutation with window notation $[-3, 5, 1, -7, 2, 8, -6, -4]$ has three cycles: the negative cycles (1 3) and (4 7 6 8) and the positive cycle (2 5). As a permutation of $\{-8, \ldots, -1, 1, \ldots, 8\}$, its cycle decomposition is (1 −3 −1 3)(2 5)(−2 −5)(4 −7 6 8 −4 7 −6 −8).

The cycle type of a signed permutation w is the pair $(\lambda, \mu)$ of two integer partitions where λ consists of the lengths of the positive cycles of w and μ consists of the lengths of the negative cycles of w. Two signed permutations u and w belong to the same conjugacy class of $S^{\pm}_n$ (that is, there exists another signed permutation g such that $gug^{-1} = w$) if and only if they have the same cycle type. In other words, the conjugacy classes in $S^{\pm}_n$ are indexed by pairs $(\lambda, \mu)$ where λ and μ are two integer partitions whose combined parts sum to n.

Equivalently, two signed permutations in $S^\pm_n$ are conjugate if and only if they have the same number of cycles of each length, and their images under the inclusion $\iota$ into the symmetric group $S_{2n}$ also have the same number of cycles of each length.

== Special elements ==
In total, the hyperoctahedral group of dimension n has $n^2$ reflections. Of these, n are the sign-change reflections across a coordinate hyperplane $\{(x_1, \ldots, x_n) : x_i = 0\}$. They are given in cycle notation by $\big\{ (i \ {-i}) : 1 \leq i \leq n \big\}$ and in window notation by $\{[1, \ldots, i - 1, -i, i + 1, \ldots, n] : i = 1, \ldots, n\};$ they form a single conjugacy class, indexed by the pair of integer partitions $(\langle 1^{n - 1} \rangle, \langle 1\rangle)$. The other $n^2 - n$ reflections are the transposition-like reflections, across the hyperplanes $\{(x_1, \ldots, x_n) : x_i = x_j\}$ or $\{(x_1, \ldots, x_n) : x_i = -x_j\}$ for $1 \leq i < j \leq n$. They are given in cycle notation by
$$\big\{ (i \ j)(-i \ {-j}) : 1 \leq i < |j| \leq n\big\}.$$
In window notation, the reflection across the plane with equation $x_i = x_j$ is given by $[1, 2, \ldots, i - 1, j, i + 1, \ldots, j - 1, i, j + 1, j + 2, \ldots, n]$ (that is, it is a transposition) while the reflection across the plane with equation $x_i + x_j = 0$ is given by $[1, 2, \ldots, i - 1, -j, i + 1, \ldots, j - 1, -i, j + 1, j + 2, \ldots, n]$ (that is, it is the result of transposing the entries i and j and also changing both of their signs). Together, they form the conjugacy class indexed by $(\langle 2, 1^{n - 2} \rangle, \varnothing)$.

The length $\ell_S(g)$ of an element g of a Coxeter group G with respect to a set S of simple reflections is the smallest number k such that g can be written as a product $g= s_{i_1} \cdots s_{i_k}$ of k elements of S. The longest element in a finite real reflection group is the (always unique) element whose Coxeter length is as large as possible. In $S^{\pm}_n$, this element is −1. That is, it is the point reflection through the origin, whose matrix is the negative of the identity matrix. Combinatorially, its window notation is [−1, −2, ..., −n]. Its Coxeter length is $n^2$ (a special case of the fact that the length of the longest element is always equal to the number of reflections in a finite real reflection group).

In a finite real reflection group W, a Coxeter element is the product of the simple reflections in any simple system (W, S). The Coxeter elements all belong to a single conjugacy class. In $S^{\pm}_n$, this is the conjugacy class indexed by $(\lambda, \mu) = (\varnothing, \langle n \rangle)$; that is, the elements with a single negative n-cycle. If c is a Coxeter element in $S^{\pm}_n$ then $c^n = -1$ is the longest element. (Note: More generally, in any finite Coxeter group that contains −1, one has for any Coxeter element that $c^{h/2} = -1$, where the Coxeter number h is the order of c.)

An element c of a reflection group W is said to be a quasi-Coxeter element if there is a factorization $c = t_1 \cdot t_2 \cdots t_k$ of c as a product of the minimum number $k = \ell_R(c)$ of reflections such that the set $\{t_1, t_2, \ldots, t_k\}$ of the factors is a generating set for W. In $S^{\pm}_n$, the quasi-Coxeter elements are precisely the Coxeter elements and their conjugates.

A signed permutation w is conjugate in $S^{\pm}_n$ to a permutation if and only if every cycle of w is positive. The number of such elements in $S^{\pm}_n$ is the double factorial $(2n - 1)!! = (2n - 1) \cdot (2n - 3) \cdots 3 \cdot 1$.

== Subgroups ==
The hyperoctahedral group has several notable families of subgroups.

=== Center ===
The center of $S^{\pm}_n$ consists solely of the longest element and the identity.

=== Index-2 subgroups ===
For $n \geq 2$, the group $S^{\pm}_n$ has three subgroups of index 2 (that is, subgroups that include exactly half the elements in $S^{\pm}_n$): the orientation-preserving symmetries of the hypercube, the even-signed permutation group (the Coxeter group of type D), and the generalized alternating group.

The alternating subgroup or even subgroup of the hyperoctahedral group is the subgroup consisting of elements of determinant 1 in the matrix representation, that is, the elements that can be written as a product of an even number of reflections. They are also the orientation-preserving symmetries of the hypercube.

A second index-2 subgroup is formed by those elements whose signed permutation has an even number of minus signs. This group is again a Coxeter group, of type D. One possible set of generators for this subgroup is $s_0s_1s_0 = (1 \ {-2})(-1 \ 2), s_1, s_2, \ldots, s_{n - 1}$, where the $s_i$ are the Coxeter generating set for $S^{\pm}_n$. It is also the symmetry group of the demihypercube, the polytope that one gets by taking the convex hull of every other vertex of the hypercube $\mathcal{H}$.

When n is odd, the hyperoctahedral group $S^{\pm}_n$ is the direct product of its even subgroup and its center, and also the product of the type-D subgroup with its center. Moreover, in this case the even subgroup and type-D subgroup are isomorphic and are further isomorphic to the quotient of $S^{\pm}_n$ by its center.

The third index-2 subgroup is the wreath product $C_2 \wr A_{n}$ of the two-element group with the alternating group of even permutations (a generalized alternating group).

=== Commutator subgroup ===
For $n \geq 2$, the commutator subgroup of $S^\pm_n$ has index 4; it is equal to the commutator subgroup of the even-signed subgroup of type D.

=== Parabolic subgroups ===
The standard parabolic subgroups of $S_n$ are the Young subgroups: for each tuple $(a_1, \ldots, a_k)$ of positive integers such that $a_1 + \ldots + a_k = n$, the Young subgroup associated to the tuple is the subgroup isomorphic to $S_{a_1} \times \cdots \times S_{a_k}$ that arises by permuting the values in each of the sets $\{1, 2, \ldots, a_1\}$, $\{a_1 + 1, a_1 + 2, \ldots, a_1 + a_2\}$, etc. among themselves. The standard parabolic subgroups of $S^\pm_n$ are the subgroups of the form $S^\pm_{a_0} \times S_{a_1} \times \cdots S_{a_k}$ where $a_0$ is a nonnegative integer and $a_1, \ldots, a_k$ are positive integers such that $a_0 + a_1 + \ldots + a_k = n$. In particular, the maximal standard parabolic subgroups of the hyperoctahedral group $S^{\pm}_n$ are the setwise stabilizers of the set $\{k, \ldots, n\}$ for $k = 1, \ldots, n$. That is, each maximal standard parabolic is isomorphic to the direct product $S^{\pm}_{k - 1} \times S_{n + 1 - k}$ of a smaller hyperoctahedral group and a symmetric group. When $k = 1$, we have as a special case that the symmetric group $S_n$ is a maximal parabolic subgroup of $S^{\pm}_n$. Meanwhile, the hyperoctahedral group $S^{\pm}_k$ is a parabolic subgroup of $S^{\pm}_n$ for all $k \leq n$.

== Relationship to card shuffling ==
The hyperoctahedral group is connected to card shuffling in two different ways. The permutations in the symmetric group $S_n$ can be interpreted as arrangements of cards in a deck of n cards, relative to some original order. For example, the permutation with one-line notation (3, 2, 1, 4) represents a deck of four cards in which the top card has been swapped with the third card from the top. Similarly, the signed permutations in $S^\pm_n$ may be interpreted as arrangements of cards in a deck of n cards in which cards may be flipped over (turned face up rather than face down). In this interpretation, the signed permutation with window notation $[-3, 2, -1, 4]$ represents the arrangement of a deck of four cards in which the top card and the third card have been swapped and furthermore both have been inserted face up instead of face down.

The second connection between the hyperoctahedral group and card shuffling concerns the mathematics of Faro shuffles (or perfect shuffles). In a Faro shuffle, a deck of size 2n is divided into two equal halves, which are then perfectly interleaved, with cards alternately coming from the two halves. There are two Faro shuffles, depending on whether the new bottom card comes from the top or bottom half of the deck. These two shuffles, viewed as permutations in $S_{2n}$, generate a subgroup, which consists of all positions the deck can reach by any repeated combination of the two shuffles. Every permutation in this subgroup is centrally symmetric, so belongs to the image $\iota(S^\pm_n)$ of the hyperoctahedral group inside the symmetric group $S_{2n}$. In fact, when $n \equiv 2 \pmod{4}$ and $n > 6$, the two Faro shuffles generate the full hyperoctahedral subgroup of $S_{2n}$. When n is odd and $n > 1$, the two Faro shuffles generate a subgroup of $\iota(S^\pm_n)$ of index 2: either the image of the alternating subgroup (when $n \equiv 3 \pmod{4}$) or the generalized alternating subgroup (when $n \equiv 3 \pmod{4}$). In other cases, the subgroup generated by the perfect shuffles is also known explicitly, but has larger index in the hyperoctahedral group.

== Associated Lie groups and algebras ==
In the theory of Lie groups (or the related theory of algebraic groups), every connected, compact Lie group has an associated finite group, called its Weyl group, that plays an important role in its representation theory. The hyperoctahedral group $S^{\pm}_n$ is the Weyl group of the "type B" and "type C" objects in the classification: the special orthogonal group SO(2n + 1) and the symplectic group Sp(n). Likewise, in the theory of Lie algebras, every complex simple Lie algebra has an associated Weyl group; $S^{\pm}_n$ is the Weyl group of the Lie algebras $\mathfrak{so}(2n + 1)$ and $\mathfrak{sp}(n)$.

== Inversions, descents, and length ==
In the symmetric group $S_n$, with respect to the generating set $S = \{(1 \ 2), (2 \ 3), \ldots, (n - 1 \ n)\}$ of adjacent transpositions, the length of a permutation w is given by its number of inversions:
$$\ell_S(w) = \operatorname{inv}( w(1) \cdots w(n))$$
where $\operatorname{inv}(w(1) \cdots w(n))$ is the number of pairs $i, j \in \{1, \ldots, n\}$ such that $i < j$ and $w(i) > w(j)$. For a signed permutation w in $S^{\pm}_n$, its length with respect to the Coxeter generating set $S = \{ (1 \ {-1}), (1 \ 2)(-1 \ {-2}), \ldots, (n - 1 \ n)(1 - n \ {-n})\}$ of § As a reflection, Coxeter, and Weyl group can be computed as
$$\ell_S(w) = \operatorname{inv}(w(1) \cdots w(n)) - \sum_{j: 1 \leq j \leq n, w(j) < 0} w(j),$$
where inv has the same meaning. This may also be written as
$$\ell_S(w) = \frac{\operatorname{inv}(w(-n) \cdots w(-1)w(1) \cdots w(n)) + \operatorname{neg}(w(1) \cdots w(n))}{2},$$
where $\operatorname{neg}(w(1) \cdots w(n))$ is the number of negative values among $\{w(1), \ldots, w(n)\}$, and as
$$\ell_S(w) = \operatorname{inv}(w(1) \cdots w(n)) + \operatorname{neg}(w(1) \cdots w(n)) + \operatorname{nsp}(w(1) \cdots w(n)),$$
where $\operatorname{nsp}(w(1) \cdots w(n))$ is the number of pairs $\{i, j\} \subset \{1, \ldots, n\}$ such that $w(i) + w(j) < 0$ ("negative sum pairs").

A simple reflection s is a (right) descent of an element w in a Coxeter group if $\ell_S(w s) = \ell_S(w) - 1$. For a permutation in the symmetric group, the adjacent transposition $s_i = (i \ i+1)$ is a descent of w if and only if $w(i) > w(i + 1)$. Similarly, for a signed permutation w, the set of descents of w is
$$\{ s_i : w(i) > w(i + 1)\},$$
where we take by convention $w(0) = 0$.

=== Generating functions ===
The generating function for $S^\pm_n$ by length is
$$\sum_{w \in S^\pm_n} q^{\ell_S(w)} = (1 + q)(1 + q + q^2 + q^3) \cdots (1 + q + \ldots + q^{2n - 1})$$
for any $n \geq 1$.

Denoting by $\operatorname{des}(w)$ the number of descents of a signed permutation w, the generating function
$$B_n(t) = \sum_{w \in S^\pm_n} t^{\operatorname{des}(w)}$$
for $S^\pm_n$ by number of descents (its Eulerian polynomial) satisfies the following identities:
$$B_n(t) = (1 + (2n - 1)t)B_{n - 1}(t) + 2t(1 - t) B'_{n - 1}(t),$$
$$\frac{B_n(t)}{(1 - t)^{n + 1}} = \sum_{k \geq 0} (2k + 1)^n t^k,$$
$$B_n(t) = (1 + t)B_{n - 1}(t) + 2t \sum_{i = 1}^{n - 1} 2^i \binom{n - 1}{i} B_{n - 1 - i}(t) \cdot A_i(t),$$
and
$$2B_n(t^2) = (1 + t)^{n + 1}A_{n}(t) + (1 - t)^{n + 1}A_n(-t),$$
where
$$A_n(t) = \sum_{w \in S_n} t^{\operatorname{des}(w)}$$
is the Eulerian polynomial for the symmetric group. The exponential generating function for the $B_n(t)$ is
$$\sum_{n \geq 0} B_n(t) \frac{z^n}{n!} = \frac{(t - 1) e^{z(t - 1)}}{t - e^{2z(t - 1)}}.$$
A trivariate generating function for the descent number and length of signed permutations over $S^\pm_n$ for all $n \geq 0$ was given by Reiner (1995).

== Polynomial invariants ==
For every subgroup G of the orthogonal group on $\R^n$, its action extends to an action on the polynomial ring $R = \R[x_1, \ldots, x_n]$ by acting on the vector $(x_1, \ldots, x_n)$ of variables linearly and then substituting. The ring of invariants of such a group is the subring $R^{G} = \{ f \in R : w(f) = f \text{ for all } w \in G\}$. The ring of invariants $R^{S^{\pm}_n}$ of the hyperoctahedral group has a simple description: it consists precisely of the symmetric polynomials in the squares $x_1^2, \ldots, x_n^2$ of the variables.

Since $S^{\pm}_n$ is a reflection group, the ring of invariants is itself a polynomial ring; that is, $R^{S^{\pm}_n} = \R[p_1, p_2, \ldots, p_n]$ for some algebraically independent set of homogeneous polynomials $p_1, \ldots, p_n$. These basic invariants are not uniquely determined by the group, but their degrees are. For the hyperoctahedral group $S^{\pm}_n$, these degrees are 2, 4, ..., 2n. One choice of basic invariants is the elementary symmetric polynomials in the squares of the variables:
$$\sum_{1 \leq i_1 < \dots < i_k \leq n} x_{i_1}^2 \cdots x_{i_k}^2$$
for $k = 1, \ldots, n$. Another choice is given by the even power sum symmetric polynomials
$$x_1^{2k} + x_2^{2k} + \ldots + x_n^{2k}$$
for $k = 1, \ldots, n$.

== Representation theory ==
The representation theory of the hyperoctahedral group was worked out by Alfred Young, in the paper (Young 1930), as an application of his study of the representation theory of symmetric groups. (The name "hyperoctahedral group" was coined in the same paper.) This was subsequently generalized by Wilhelm Specht to the representation theory of more general wreath products.

Concretely, the isomorphism classes of irreducible representations of $S^\pm_n$ are indexed by pairs $(\lambda, \mu)$ of integer partitions for which the sum $|\lambda| + |\mu|$ of the sizes is equal to n. The irreducible character $\chi^{\lambda, \varnothing}$ indexed by $(\lambda, \varnothing)$ is the induced representation of the symmetric group character indexed by $\lambda$ from the subgroup $S_n$ to $S^\pm_n$; the character indexed by $(\varnothing, \mu)$ is the tensor product $\delta \otimes \chi^{\mu, \varnothing}$ where $\delta$ is the linear character that takes the value +1 on transpositions in $S^\pm_n$ and takes the value −1 on sign-change reflections; and if $\lambda$ is a partition of k and $\mu$ is a partition of n − k, then $\chi^{\lambda, \mu}$ is the induction product of $\chi^{\lambda, \varnothing} \otimes \chi^{\varnothing, \mu}$ from $S^{\pm}_k \times S^\pm_{n - k}$ to $S^\pm_n$. These characterizations can be combined with the Murnaghan–Nakayama rule to give a combinatorial formula for character values. And there is a characteristic map from the character ring to a ring of symmetric functions in two sets of variables.

The projective representations of $S^\pm_n$ likewise have a close relationship to the projective and linear representations of the symmetric group.

== Tableau insertion algorithms ==
Each integer partition $\lambda = \langle \lambda_1, \ldots, \lambda_\ell\rangle$ is associated to a Young diagram, an arrangement of left-aligned boxes with $\lambda_1$ boxes in the first row, $\lambda_2$ boxes in the second row, and so on. A standard Young tableau of shape λ is a filling of the Young diagram of λ with the numbers 1, 2, ..., $|\lambda|$ so that numbers increase in each row from left to right and in each column from smaller-numbered rows to larger-numbered rows. The Robinson–Schensted correspondence is a bijection between the symmetric group $S_n$ and the set of pairs (P, Q) of standard Young tableaux such that the shapes of P and Q are the same partition of n. It provides a crucial connection between combinatorics, the theory of symmetric functions, and the representation theory of the symmetric group.

There are several versions of the Robinson–Schensted correspondence for the hyperoctahedral group. In one of these, the role of standard Young tableaux is played by bitableaux: if λ and μ are two partitions of total size n, a standard bitableau of shape $(\lambda, \mu)$ is an ordered pair $(T_1, T_2)$ such that $T_1$ and $T_2$ are fillings of the Young diagrams of λ and μ, respectively, and the two tableaux together are filled with {1, 2, ..., n} and each one obeys the order conditions of a standard Young tableau. Then there is a bijection between $S^\pm_n$ and pairs $(P, Q)$ where $P = (P_1, P_2)$ and $Q = (Q_1, Q_2)$ are bitableaux of the same shape (a bipartition of n). The bijection can be realized essentially by applying the usual (symmetric group) Robinson–Schensted correspondence separately to the positive and negative entries of the window notation of a signed permutation.

Other signed versions of the Robinson–Schensted correspondence give a bijection between $S^\pm_n$ and pairs $(P, Q)$ of domino tableaux of the same shape. In this context, a domino tableau of shape λ is a filling of the Young diagram of λ in which pairs of adjacent boxes (either in the same row or same column) are grouped into dominoes before being filled, subject to the same requirement that the filling increases along rows and columns. (Note: Explicit bijections exist between domino tableaux and bitableaux, as well as between domino tableaux and standard Young tableaux fixed by the Schützenberger involution.) (Note: Implementations of the Garfinkle–Barbasch–Vogan domino insertion algorithm, as well as the Robinson–Schensted correspondence, are given at Johnson (2018).)

== Bruhat order and weak order ==
The Hasse diagram of the Bruhat order for the hyperoctahedral group S^{±}_{3}. The edges that correspond to multiplication on the right by a simple reflection are thickened.

The Bruhat order is a natural order on every Coxeter group, defined as the transitive closure of the relation that u < w whenever there is a reflection t such that $ut = w$ and $\ell_S(u) < \ell_S(w)$. (The name Bruhat order arises from the connection with the Bruhat decomposition of algebraic groups.) Thus, in the symmetric group, one has $u \leq w$ if and only if one can get from u to w by applying a sequence of transpositions, each of which swaps two entries i, j such that the smaller entry is to the left in the one-line notation. The corresponding notion in $S^\pm_n$ is as follows: one has that $u < w$ in Bruhat order if there is a sequence of steps $u = u_0 \to u_1 \to \cdots \to u_k = w$ where at each step we have either $u_{m + 1} = u_m \cdot (i \ j)(-i \ {-j})$ where i, j are elements of $\{\pm 1, \ldots, \pm n\}$ such that $i < j$, $|i| \neq |j|$, and $u_m(i) < u_m(j)$, or $u_{m + 1} = u_m \cdot (i \ {-i})$ where $i \in \{1, \ldots, n\}$ is such that $u_m(-i) < u_m(i)$. It follows that, viewing $S_n$ as the subgroup of $S^\pm_n$ consisting of signed permutations whose window notation contains no negative entries, one has that two permutations $u, w$ satisfy $u \leq w$ as elements of $S_n$ if and only if $u \leq w$ as elements of $S^\pm_n$.

There is another simple criterion to tell whether one permutation is less than another in Bruhat order, in terms of comparing the number of 1s in certain regions of the permutation matrices of u and w. The analogous criterion in the hyperoctahedral group is as follows: given a signed permutation v of size n and two integers $i, j \in [-n, n]$, define $v[i, j]$ to be the number of integers $a \in [-n, n]$ such that $a \leq i$ and $v(a) \geq j$, where v(0) is taken to be 0. Then for signed permutations u and w of size n, one has $u \leq w$ in Bruhat order if and only if $u[i, j] \leq w[i, j]$ for all $i, j \in [-n, n]$. It furthermore follows that $u \leq w$ if and only if $\iota(u)$ is less than $\iota(w)$ in the Bruhat order on $S_{2n}$, where $\iota$ is the inclusion map defined in § As a permutation group.

Hasse diagrams of the Bruhat order, left weak order, and right weak order for the hyperoctahedral group S^{±}_{2}

For any Coxeter group W with simple generating set S, there are two subposets of the Bruhat order called the left and right weak orders. (Note: The terminology "weak" is due to the fact that they have fewer relations than the Bruhat order.) These posets are not the same, but they are isomorphic: an element u is less than w in the right weak order if and only if $u^{-1}$ is less than $w^{-1}$ in the left weak order, so any property of one can be deduced from the corresponding property of the other. In general, the left weak order $\leq_L$ may be characterized in several equivalent ways:

- it is the transitive closure of the relation $u <_L w$ when there is a simple reflection s in S such that $su = w$ and $\ell_S(u) < \ell_S(w)$;
- $u \leq_L w$ if and only if $\ell_S(u) + \ell_S(wu^{-1}) = \ell_S(w)$; and
- $u \leq_L w$ if and only if the (right) inversion set $T_R(u) = \{t \text{ a reflection in } W : \ell_S(ut) < \ell_S(u)\}$ is contained in the right inversion set of w,

among others.

In the case of a permutation w in the symmetric group $S_n$, the right inversion set $T_R(w)$ coincides with the notion of inversions described above, namely, a transposition (i j) is a (right) inversion of w if and only if $i < j$ and $w(i) > w(j)$. In the case of a signed permutation $w \in S^\pm_n$, its right inversion set may be decomposed into three pieces, that correspond to the sets

- $\operatorname{Inv}(w) = \{ (i, j) : 1 \leq i < j \leq n \text{ and } w(i) > w(j)\}$,
- $\operatorname{Neg}(w) = \{ i : 1 \leq i \leq n \text{ and } w(i) < 0\}$, and
- $\operatorname{Nsp}(w) = \{ (i, j) : 1 \leq i < j \leq n \text{ and } w(i) + w(j) < 0\}$,

and it holds for two signed permutations $u, w$ that $u \leq_L w$ if and only if $\operatorname{Inv}(u) \subseteq \operatorname{Inv}(w)$, $\operatorname{Neg}(u) \subseteq \operatorname{Neg}(w)$, and $\operatorname{Nsp}(u) \subseteq \operatorname{Nsp}(w)$.

== Absolute order and noncrossing partitions ==
The six noncrossing partitions of a four-element set that are fixed by 180 degree rotation, with their corresponding elements of the hyperoctahedral group S^{±}_{2}

In a reflection group W, the reflection length $\ell_T(w)$ of an element w is the smallest number k such that there exist reflections $t_1, \ldots, t_k$ in W such that w is equal to the product $t_1 \cdots t_k$ of the reflections. In a finite real reflection group acting on a space V of dimension n, the reflection length of an element w is equal to n − dim(fix(w)), where $\operatorname{fix}(w) = \{v \in V : w(v) = v\}$ is the fixed space of w. In the case that $w \in S^{\pm}_n$ is viewed as a signed permutation, this fixed space dimension is equal to the number of positive cycles of w. That is, if the conjugacy class of w is (λ, μ), then the reflection length is $n - \ell(\lambda)$ where $\ell(\lambda)$ is the number of parts of the partition λ.

In a reflection group W, the absolute order is the partial order $\leq_T$ on W defined by $u \leq_T w$ if
$$\ell_T(u) + \ell_T(u^{-1}w) = \ell_T(w),$$
and the lattice of $W$-noncrossing partitions is the interval in absolute order that lies below a Coxeter element of W (as in § Special elements). (Note: This definition of noncrossing partitions depends not just on W but also on the choice of Coxeter element; however, all choices of Coxeter elements yield isomorphic posets.) This poset derives its name because, in the case of the symmetric group $S_n$, there is a one-to-one correspondence between the elements of the lattice of $S_n$-noncrossing partitions and the set partitions of the set $\{1, 2, \ldots, n\}$ that are noncrossing, in the sense that when the numbers 1, 2, ..., n are drawn in order on the boundary of a circle and the parts of the partition are drawn as their convex hulls, no two parts intersect. Moreover, under this correspondence, the order relation corresponds to the refinement order on set partitions. In the case of the hyperoctahedral group $S^{\pm}_{n}$, the lattice of noncrossing partitions is isomorphic to the sublattice of noncrossing partitions of a 2n-element set that are symmetric under 180° rotation.

The number of noncrossing partitions of an n-element set is the nth Catalan number $C_n = \frac{1}{n + 1}\binom{2n}{n}$, with the number of partitions at each rank given by a Narayana number. The corresponding number of noncrossing partitions for $S^{\pm}_{n}$ is the central binomial coefficient $\binom{2n}{n}$, with the number of elements at rank k equal to $\binom{n}{k}^2$.

== Associated polyhedra ==
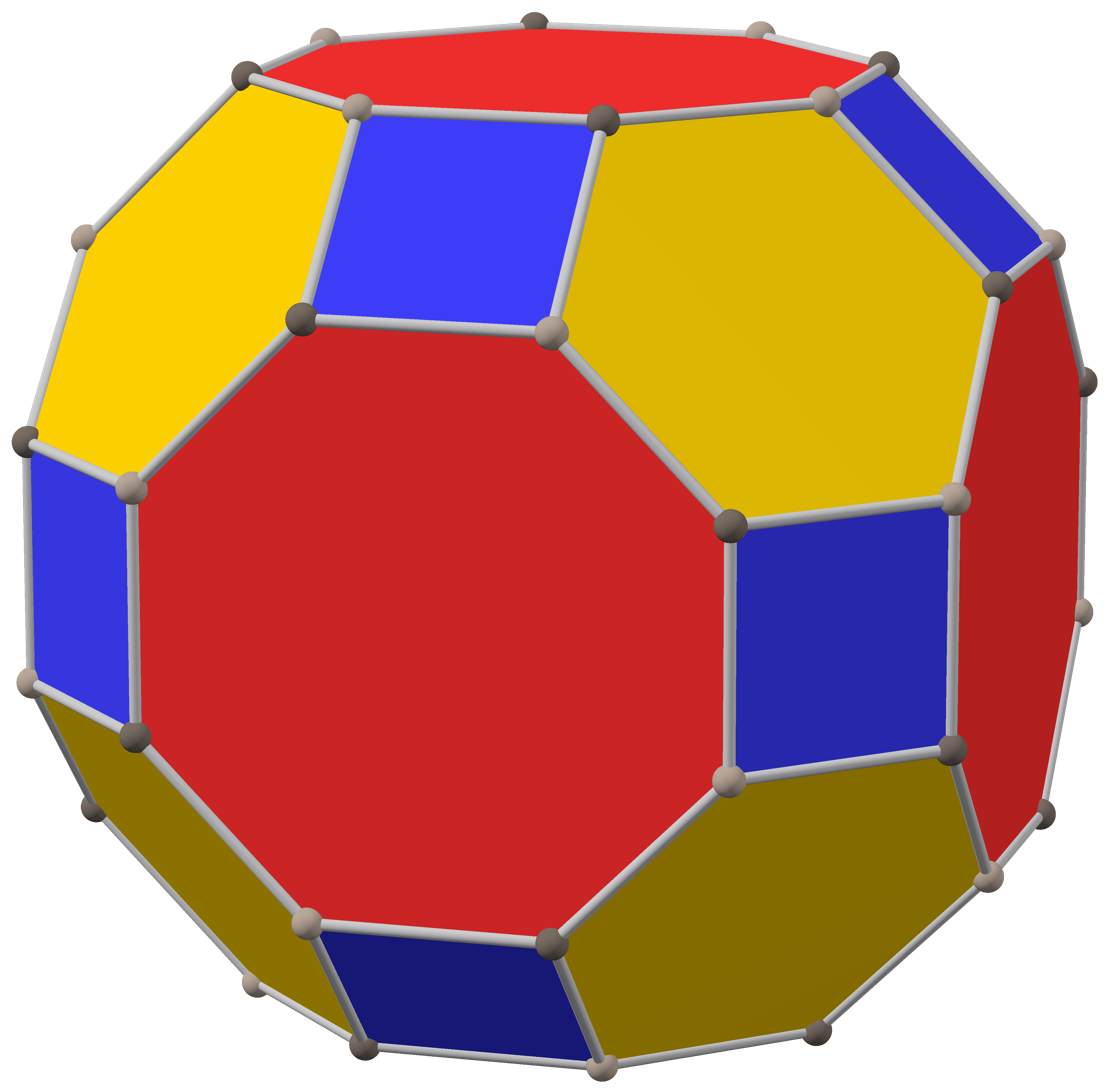
A truncated cuboctahedron, the three-dimensional type-B permutohedron

In addition to its connection with the hypercube and the cross-polytope, the hyperoctahedral group is associated with other polyhedra. The n-dimensional polytope whose vertices are all the permutations of (±1, ±2, ..., ±n) is the type-B permutohedron, a signed analogue of the permutohedron. (A combinatorially equivalent polytope can be constructed by taking the convex hull of the orbit under $S^\pm_n$ of any sufficiently generic point in $\R^n$.) Its 1-skeleton is the Hasse diagram of the weak order on $S^\pm_n$. In the case $n = 2$ it is an octagon, while in the case $n = 3$ it is the truncated cuboctahedron.

The cyclohedron is the type-B analogue of the associahedron. Just as the facets of the associahedron can be indexed by sets of noncrossing diagonals of an (n + 2)-gon, the facets of the cyclohedron can be indexed by centrally symmetric sets of noncrossing diagonals of a (2n + 2)-gon. Its 1-skeleton is a contraction of the 1-skeleton of the type-B permutohedron.

== Homology ==
The group homology of the hyperoctahedral group exhibits stabilization, in the sense of stable homotopy theory: the homology groups $H_i(S^\pm_n)$ and $H_i(S^\pm_{n + 1})$ are isomorphic whenever $n \geq 2i$, and so in particular they are eventually independent of n. (This is true regardless of the choice of coefficients.)

The homologies $H_i(S^\pm_n)$ with coefficients $\Z$ have been explicitly computed for small i. The first homology group $H_1(S^\pm_n; \Z)$ is the same as the abelianization. For any Coxeter group W, the abelianization is a elementary 2–group with one generator for each component of graph obtained from the Coxeter–Dynkin diagram by deleting all the edges with even labels (equivalently, one generator for each conjugacy class of reflections). Thus, $H_1(S^\pm_1; \Z) = \Z/2\Z$ and $H_1(S^\pm_n; \Z) = \Z/2\Z \oplus \Z/2\Z$ for $n \geq 2$, with stabilization at the Klein four-group.

The second homology groups $H_2(S^\pm_n,\Z)$ (also known as the Schur multipliers) were computed by Ihara and Yokonuma. They are trivial for $n = 0, 1$, and given by $H_2(S^\pm_2,\Z) = \Z/2\Z$, $H_2(S^\pm_3,\Z) = (\Z/2\Z)^2$, and $H_2(S^\pm_n,\Z) = (\Z/2\Z)^3$ for $n \geq 4$. The third homology groups have also been computed; they stabilize at $(\Z/2\Z)^7 \oplus \Z/3\Z \oplus (\Z/4\Z)^2$ for $n \geq 6$.

== Other properties ==
The hyperoctahedral group $S^{\pm}_n$ is a subgroup of the orthogonal group $O(n)$ of $n \times n$ orthogonal matrices. It consists exactly of those orthogonal matrices whose entries are all integers.

For $n \geq 2$, the group $S^{\pm}_n$ has a minimal generating set of size 2.

For any finite group G, the strong symmetric genus of G is the smallest genus of an orientable surface on which G acts faithfully as a group of orientation-preserving automorphisms. For all $n \geq 3$, the strong symmetric genus of $S^\pm_n$ is equal to $\frac{n! \cdot 2^{n - 3}}{3} + 1$, with the exception of $n = 5$ (when the genus is 289 instead of $\frac{5! \cdot 2^{5 - 3}}{3} + 1 = 161$), $n = 6$ (3841 instead of 1921), and $n = 8$ (645,121 instead of 537,601).

Aside from length and descents, other permutation statistics (such as the major index or the excedance number) can be defined on $S^\pm_n$. However, there are often multiple candidate definitions for these statistics.

== Generalizations and extensions ==
=== Colored permutations ===
The hyperoctahedral groups $S^{\pm}_n$ are generalized by the groups $G(r, n)$ of r-colored permutations, defined as the wreath product $G(r, n) = C_r \wr S_n$ of the cyclic group $C_r$ by the symmetric group $S_n$. The group $G(r, n)$ may be concretely represented as the group of $n \times n$ monomial matrices whose nonzero entries are complex rth roots of unity. For $r > 2$, these groups are no longer real reflection groups; instead, they belong to the infinite family of imprimitive complex reflection groups. In particular, the group $G(r, n)$ is generated by n complex reflections: the n − 1 matrices of the adjacent transpositions, together with the matrix
$$\begin{bmatrix} \zeta & 0 & \cdots & 0 \\ 0 & 1 & \cdots & 0 \\ \vdots & \vdots & \ddots & \vdots \\ 0 & 0 & \cdots & 1\end{bmatrix},$$
where $\zeta = e^{2\pi i/r}$ is a primitive rth root of unity.

=== Affine Coxeter groups ===
The fixed lines of the reflections of the affine group $\widetilde{S}^{\pm}_2$ divide the plane into isosceles right triangles.

Each finite Weyl group W is associated to an affine Coxeter group, which is generated by the group W together with a reflection across a translated copy of one of the reflecting hyperplanes of a reflection in W. In the case of the dihedral group $S^\pm_2$ of order 8, there is (up to isomorphism) a unique associated affine Coxeter group. The lines of the reflections in the group divide the plane into an infinite number of congruent isosceles right triangles (the tetrakis square tiling). When $n > 2$, there are two different affine extensions of $S^\pm_n$, corresponding to the two different crystallographic root systems associated to the group. Viewing $S^{\pm}_n$ as a Weyl group acting by linear transformations on $\R^n$, in both cases, the affine group is generated by the finite group $S^{\pm}_n$ together with a single reflection, across a hyperplane with equation $x \cdot \alpha = 1$ where $\alpha$ is the highest root of the root system and ⋅ is the standard dot product. In type B, the highest root is $e_{n - 1} + e_{n}$, corresponding to the reflection across the hyperplane $x_{n - 1} + x_n = 1$, while in type C, the highest root is $2e_n$, corresponding to the reflection across the hyperplane with equation $2x_n = 1$.

The affine type B and C Coxeter groups associated with $S^\pm_n$ have Coxeter–Dynkin diagrams

... and ...,

respectively.

Both affine groups also have combinatorial realizations. The affine group of type C can be realized as the set of bijections $w: \Z \to \Z$ such that $w(-i) = -w(i)$ and $w(2n + 2 - i) = 2n + 2 - w(i)$ for all $i \in \Z$. In other words, these are the bijections on $\Z$ that commute with the reflection across 0 and also the reflection across n + 1 (and consequently with the infinite dihedral group of symmetries of $\Z$ generated by these two reflections). By construction, all permutations in this combinatorial model fix the multiples of n + 1. Alternatively, one may consider a slightly different combinatorial model, consisting of permutations $w: \Z \to \Z$ such that $w(-i) = -w(i)$ and $w(i + 2n + 1) = w(i) + 2n + 1$ for all $i \in \Z$. In either model, such a permutation is completely determined by its n values $w(1), \ldots, w(n)$.

For $n \geq 3$, the affine group of type B is the subgroup of the group of type C consisting of those permutations for which the number of positive integers i such that w(i) is negative is even. (This number is always finite.) Both affine groups can furthermore be realized as subgroups of an appropriate affine symmetric group.

=== Braid group ===
Each Coxeter group W is associated to an Artin–Tits group $B_W$, which is defined by a similar presentation that omits relations of the form $s^2 = 1$ for each generator s. In particular, the Artin–Tits group associated to $S^{\pm}_n$ is generated by n elements $\sigma_0, \sigma_1, \ldots, \sigma_{n - 1}$ subject to the relations $\sigma_0\sigma_1\sigma_0\sigma_1 = \sigma_1\sigma_0\sigma_1\sigma_0$ and $\sigma_i \sigma_{i + 1} \sigma_i = \sigma_{i + 1}\sigma_i \sigma_{i + 1}$ for $i = 1, \ldots, n - 2$ (and no others).

Artin–Tits groups are sometimes also known as generalized braid groups, because the Artin–Tits group $B_{S_n}$ of the (finite) symmetric group is the braid group on n strands. Not all Artin–Tits groups have a natural representation in terms of geometric braids. However, the Artin–Tits group of the hyperoctahedral group $S^{\pm}_n$ does have such a representation: it is given by the subgroup of the braid group on $n + 1$ strands consisting of those braids for which a particular strand ends in the same position it started in, or equivalently as the braid group of n strands in an annular region. The Artin–Tits group of $S^{\pm}_n$ is also isomorphic to the mapping class group of a closed disc with n + 1 marked points, with a single point fixed pointwise, and can be written as a semidirect product of the braid group $B_{\widetilde{S}_n}$ of the affine symmetric group with an infinite cyclic group.

=== Infinite hyperoctahedral group ===
If one views the hyperoctahedral group $S^\pm_n$ as acting on $\Z$, fixing all integers of magnitude larger than n, this induces a containment $S^\pm_1 \subset S^\pm_2 \subset S^\pm_3 \subset \cdots$. Then the infinite hyperoctahedral group $S^\pm_\infty$ can be defined as the union $S^\pm_\infty = \bigcup_{n \geq 1} S^\pm_n$ of these groups (or in other words as the direct limit of the sequence of inclusions). Combinatorially, this group may be viewed as the group of bijections $w: \Z \to \Z$ such that $w(-i) = -w(i)$ for all i and $w(i) \neq i$ for only finitely many $i \in \Z$.

== Tables and diagrams ==
The Coxeter–Dynkin diagram for $S^{\pm}_n$ is

...

with n nodes; the corresponding Coxeter bracket notation is

[3, 3, 3, ..., 3, 4] = [3^{n−2}, 4].

The Coxeter–Dynkin diagrams of the associated affine Coxeter groups are

...

for type $\widetilde{\mathrm{B}}_n$ and

...

for type $\widetilde{\mathrm{C}}_n$.

The following table collects various "numerological" data attached to the hyperoctahedral groups.

	$S^{\pm}_n$
Cardinality	$2^n n!$
Degrees	2, 4, 6, ..., 2n
Coxeter number h	2n
Number of reflections	$n^2$
Number of positive roots	$n^2$
Number of roots	$2n^2$
Exponents	1, 3, 5, ..., 2n − 1
W-Catalan number	$\binom{2n}{n}$
W-Narayana numbers	$\binom{n}{k}^2$, $k = 0, 1, \ldots, n$
Connection index (Note: The index of the root lattice in the weight lattice.)	2

== See also ==
- Hexadecachoric symmetry, the four-dimensional case (symmetry group of the tesseract and 16-cell)
- 5-cube, 5-orthoplex, 6-cube, 6-orthoplex, the five- and six-dimensional regular polytopes with hyperoctahedral symmetry

== Works cited ==
- Adin, Ron M.; Roichman, Yuval (2001), "The Flag Major Index and Group Actions on Polynomial Rings", European Journal of Combinatorics, 22 (4): 431–446, doi:10.1006/eujc.2000.0469
- Aldous, David; Diaconis, Persi (1986), "Shuffling Cards and Stopping Times", The American Mathematical Monthly, 93 (5): 333–348, doi:10.2307/2323590, JSTOR 2323590
- Armstrong, Drew (2009), Generalized Noncrossing Partitions and Combinatorics of Coxeter Groups, Memoirs of the American Mathematical Society, vol. 202, American Mathematical Society, arXiv:math/0611106, doi:10.1090/S0065-9266-09-00565-1, ISBN 978-0-8218-4490-8
- Baake, M. (1984), "Structure and representations of the hyperoctahedral group", Journal of Mathematical Physics, 25 (11): 3171–3182, doi:10.1063/1.526087
- Baumeister, Barbara; Gobet, Thomas; Roberts, Kieran; Wegener, Patrick (2017), "On the Hurwitz action in finite Coxeter groups", Journal of Group Theory, 20 (1): 103–131, doi:10.1515/jgth-2016-0025
- Björner, Anders; Brenti, Francesco (2005), Combinatorics of Coxeter groups, Springer, doi:10.1007/3-540-27596-7, ISBN 978-3540-442387
- Boyd, Rachael (2020), "The low-dimensional homology of finite-rank Coxeter groups", Algebraic & Geometric Topology, 20 (5): 2609–2655, doi:10.2140/agt.2020.20.2609
- Bożejko, Marek; Dołęga, Maciej; Ejsmont, Wiktor; Gal, Światosław R. (2023), "Reflection length with two parameters in the asymptotic representation theory of type B/C and applications", Journal of Functional Analysis, 284 (5) 109797, arXiv:2104.14530, doi:10.1016/j.jfa.2022.109797
- Bröcker, Theodor; tom Dieck, Tammo (1985), Representations of Compact Lie Groups, Graduate Texts in Mathematics, Springer-Verlag, ISBN 0-387-13678-9
- Carter, R.W. (1972), "Conjugacy classes in the Weyl group", Compositio Mathematica, 25 (1): 1–59
- Charney, Ruth; Peifer, David (2003), "The $K(\pi,1)$-conjecture for the affine braid groups", Commentarii Mathematici Helvetici, 78 (3): 584–600, doi:10.1007/S00014-003-0764-Y
- Chen, William Y.C.; Stanley, Richard P. (1993), "Derangements on the n-cube", Discrete Mathematics, 115 (1–3): 65–75, doi:10.1016/0012-365X(93)90479-D
- Coxeter, H.S.M. (1973), Regular Polytopes (3 ed.), Dover, ISBN 0-486-61480-8
- Coxeter, H.S.M.; Moser, W.O.J. (1980), Generators and Relations for Discrete Groups, Ergebnisse der Mathematik und ihrer Grenzgebiete, vol. 14 (4th ed.), Springer-Verlag, ISBN 3-540-09212-9
- Diaconis, Persi; Graham, R. L.; Kantor, William M. (1983), "The mathematics of perfect shuffles", Advances in Applied Mathematics, 4 (2): 175–196, doi:10.1016/0196-8858(83)90009-X
- Dyer, Matthew J. (2001), "On minimal lengths of expressions of Coxeter group elements as products of reflections", Proceedings of the American Mathematical Society, 129 (9): 2591–2595, doi:10.1090/S0002-9939-01-05876-2, JSTOR 2668782
- Egge, Eric (2007), "Restricted Symmetric Permutations", Annals of Combinatorics, 11 (3–4): 405–434, doi:10.1007/s00026-007-0327-9
- Eriksson, Henrik; Eriksson, Kimmo (1998), "Affine Weyl groups as infinite permutations", The Electronic Journal of Combinatorics, 5 R18, doi:10.37236/1356
- Fomin, Sergey; Reading, Nathan (2007), "Root systems and generalized associahedra", Geometric combinatorics, IAS/Park City Math. Ser., vol. 13, American Mathematical Society, pp. 63–131, ISBN 978-0-8218-3736-8
- Fulton, William; Harris, Joe (1991), Representation Theory: A First Course, Graduate Texts in Mathematics, vol. 129, Springer-Verlag, ISBN 978-0-387-97527-6
- Gallian, Joseph A. (2013), Contemporary Abstract Algebra (8th ed.), Brooks/Cole, ISBN 978-1-133-59970-8, LCCN 2012938179
- Goodman, Frederick M. (2014), Algebra: abstract and concrete (2.6 ed.), SemiSimple Press, ISBN 978-0-9799142-1-8
- Heidersdorf, Th.; Tyriard, G. (2025), "On Interpolation Categories for the Hyperoctahedral Group", Algebras and Representation Theory, 28 (2): 613–646, doi:10.1007/s10468-025-10331-y
- Heng, Edmund; Nge, Kie Seng (2024), "Curves in the disc, the type B braid group, and a type B zigzag algebra", Quantum Topology, 15 (2): 337–417, doi:10.4171/qt/198
- Hepworth, Richard (2016), "Homological stability for families of Coxeter groups", Algebraic & Geometric Topology, 16 (5): 2779–2811, doi:10.2140/agt.2016.16.2779
- Hetyei, Gábor (2024), "The type B permutohedron and the poset of intervals as a Tchebyshev transform", Discrete & Computational Geometry, 71 (3): 918–944, doi:10.1007/s00454-023-00490-4
- Hudson, Thomas; Matsumura, Tomoo (2019), "Symplectic and odd orthogonal Pfaffian formulas for algebraic cobordism", Pacific Journal of Mathematics, 302 (1): 97–118, arXiv:1710.07093, doi:10.2140/pjm.2019.302.97
- Humphreys, James E. (1990), Reflection groups and Coxeter groups, Cambridge University Press, doi:10.1017/CBO9780511623646, ISBN 0-521-37510-X
- Ihara, Shin-ichiro; Yokonuma, Takeo (1965), "On the second cohomology groups (Schur-multipliers) of finite reflection groups", Journal of the Faculty of Science. University of Tokyo. Section IA. Mathematics, 11: 155–171, MR 0190232
- Isaacs, I. Martin (1994), Algebra: A Graduate Course, Graduate Studies in Mathematics, vol. 100, American Mathematical Society, ISBN 978-0-8218-4799-2
- Jackson, Michael A. (2004), "The strong symmetric genus of the hyperoctahedral groups", Journal of Group Theory, 7 (4): 495–505, doi:10.1515/jgth.2004.7.4.495
- Johnson, Devra Garfinkle (2018), Tableaux Algorithms
- Kallipoliti, Myrto (2011), "The absolute order on the hyperoctahedral group", Journal of Algebraic Combinatorics, 34 (2): 183–211, doi:10.1007/s10801-010-0267-z
- Kane, Richard (2001), Reflection groups and invariant theory, CMS Books in Mathematics/Ouvrages de Mathématiques de la SMC, Springer-Verlag, doi:10.1007/978-1-4757-3542-0, ISBN 0-387-98979-X
- Kantor, William M.; Liebler, Robert A. (1982), "The rank 3 permutation representations of the finite classical groups", Transactions of the American Mathematical Society, 271 (1): 1–71, doi:10.1090/S0002-9947-1982-0648077-6
- Kent, IV, Richard P.; Peifer, David (2002), "A geometric and algebraic description of annular braid groups", International Conference on Geometric and Combinatorial Methods in Group Theory and Semigroup Theory (Lincoln, NE, 2000), International Journal of Algebra and Computation, 12 (1–2): 85–97, doi:10.1142/S0218196702000997
- Kerber, Adalbert (1971), Representations of Permutation Groups I, Lecture Notes in Mathematics, vol. 240, Springer-Verlag, doi:10.1007/BFb0067943, ISBN 978-3-540-05693-5, MR 0325752
- Kirillov, Alexander (2008), Introduction to Lie groups and Lie algebras (PDF), Cambridge studies in advanced mathematics, Cambridge University Press, ISBN 9780521889698
- Lehrer, Gustav I.; Taylor, Donald E. (2009), Unitary reflection groups, Australian Mathematical Society Lecture Series, vol. 20, Cambridge University Press, ISBN 978-0-521-74989-3, MR 2542964
- McCammond, Jon (2017), "The mysterious geometry of Artin groups", Winter Braids Lecture Notes, 4 (Winter Braids VII (Caen, 2017)): Exp. No. 1, 30, doi:10.5802/wbln.17, S2CID 128279613
- Miller, G. A. (1918), "Groups formed by special matrices", Bulletin of the American Mathematical Society, 24 (4): 203–6, doi:10.1090/S0002-9904-1918-03043-7
- Petersen, T. Kyle (2015), Eulerian Numbers, Birkhäuser Advanced Texts, Springer, doi:10.1007/978-1-4939-3091-3, ISBN 978-1-4939-3090-6
- Reiner, Victor (1993), "Signed Permutation Statistics and Cycle Type", European Journal of Combinatorics, 14 (6): 569–579, doi:10.1006/eujc.1993.1059
- Reiner, Victor (1995), "The distribution of descents and length in a Coxeter group", The Electronic Journal of Combinatorics, 2 R25, doi:10.37236/1219
- Sagan, Bruce (2001), The Symmetric Group (2 ed.), Springer-Verlag, ISBN 978-0-387-95067-9
- Simion, Rodica (2000a), "Combinatorial statistics on type-B analogues of noncrossing partitions and restricted permutations", The Electronic Journal of Combinatorics, 7 R9, doi:10.37236/1487
- Simion, Rodica (2000b), "Noncrossing partitions", Discrete Mathematics, 217 (1–3): 367–409, doi:10.1016/S0012-365X(99)00273-3
- Simion, Rodica (2003), "A type-B associahedron", Advances in Applied Mathematics, 30 (1–2): 2–25, doi:10.1016/S0196-8858(02)00522-5
- Sloane, Neil; et al., eds. (2026), "Triangle of f-vectors of the simplicial complexes dual to the permutohedra of type B_n", The On-Line Encyclopedia of Integer Sequences, OEIS Foundation Inc., Sequence A145901
- Stanley, Richard P. (1999), Enumerative Combinatorics, Cambridge Studies in Advanced Mathematics, vol. 2, Cambridge University Press, ISBN 978-0-521-78987-5
- Stembridge, John R. (1992), "The projective representations of the hyperoctahedral group", Journal of Algebra, 145 (2): 396–453, doi:10.1016/0021-8693(92)90110-8, hdl:2027.42/30235
- Tenner, Bridget Eileen (2007), "On expected factors in reduced decompositions in type B", European Journal of Combinatorics, 28 (4): 1144–1151, doi:10.1016/j.ejc.2006.01.013
- van Leeuwen, Marc A. A. (1996), "The Robinson-Schensted and Schützenberger algorithms, an elementary approach", The Electronic Journal of Combinatorics, 3 (2) R15, doi:10.37236/1273
- Wilson, Jennifer C.H. (2014), "$\mathrm{FI}_{\mathcal{W}}$-modules and stability criteria for representations of classical Weyl groups", Journal of Algebra, 420: 269–332, doi:10.1016/j.jalgebra.2014.08.010
- Woo, Alexander (2018), "Hultman Elements for the Hyperoctahedral Groups", The Electronic Journal of Combinatorics, 25 (2) P2.41, doi:10.37236/7636
- Young, Alfred (1930), "On Quantitative Substitutional Analysis 5", Proceedings of the London Mathematical Society, Series 2, 31: 273–288, doi:10.1112/plms/s2-31.1.273, JFM 56.0135.02
- Yu, Houyi (2024), "The weak order on the hyperoctahedral group and the monomial basis for the Hopf algebra of signed permutations", Discrete Mathematics, 347 (6) 113942, doi:10.1016/j.disc.2024.113942
