= Generalized permutation matrix =

Matrix with one nonzero entry in each row and column

In mathematics, a generalized permutation matrix (or monomial matrix) is a matrix with the same nonzero pattern as a permutation matrix, i.e. there is exactly one nonzero entry in each row and each column. Unlike a permutation matrix, where the nonzero entry must be 1, in a generalized permutation matrix the nonzero entry can be any nonzero value. An example of a generalized permutation matrix is

$$\begin{bmatrix}
0 &  0 & 3 & 0\\
0 & -7 & 0 & 0\\
1 &  0 & 0 & 0\\
0 &  0 & 0 & \sqrt2\end{bmatrix}.$$

== Structure ==
An invertible matrix A is a generalized permutation matrix if and only if it can be written as a product of an invertible diagonal matrix D and an (implicitly invertible) permutation matrix P: i.e.,

$$A = DP.$$

=== Group structure ===
The set of n × n generalized permutation matrices with entries in a field F forms a subgroup of the general linear group GL(n, F), in which the group of nonsingular diagonal matrices Δ(n, F) forms a normal subgroup. Indeed, over all fields except GF(2), the generalized permutation matrices are the normalizer of the diagonal matrices, meaning that the generalized permutation matrices are the largest subgroup of GL(n, F) in which diagonal matrices are normal.

The abstract group of generalized permutation matrices is the wreath product of F^{×} and S_{n}. Concretely, this means that it is the semidirect product of Δ(n, F) by the symmetric group S_{n}:

S_{n} ⋉ Δ(n, F),

where S_{n} acts by permuting coordinates and the diagonal matrices Δ(n, F) are isomorphic to the n-fold product (F^{×})^{n}.

To be precise, the generalized permutation matrices are a (faithful) linear representation of this abstract wreath product: a realization of the abstract group as a subgroup of matrices.

=== Subgroups ===
- The subgroup where all entries are 1 is exactly the permutation matrices, which is isomorphic to the symmetric group.
- The subgroup where all entries are ±1 is the signed permutation matrices, which is the hyperoctahedral group.
- The subgroup where the entries are mth roots of unity $\mu_m$ is isomorphic to a generalized symmetric group.
- The subgroup of diagonal matrices is abelian, normal, and a maximal abelian subgroup. The quotient group is the symmetric group, and this construction is in fact the Weyl group of the general linear group: the diagonal matrices are a maximal torus in the general linear group (and are their own centralizer), the generalized permutation matrices are the normalizer of this torus, and the quotient, $N(T)/Z(T) = N(T)/T \cong S_n$ is the Weyl group.

== Properties ==
- If a nonsingular matrix and its inverse are both nonnegative matrices (i.e. matrices with nonnegative entries), then the matrix is a generalized permutation matrix.
- The determinant of a generalized permutation matrix is given by
  $$\det(G)=\det(P)\cdot \det(D)=\operatorname{sgn}(\pi)\cdot d_{11}\cdot \ldots \cdot d_{nn},$$
  where $\operatorname{sgn}(\pi)$ is the sign of the permutation $\pi$ associated with $P$ and $d_{11},\ldots ,d_{nn}$ are the diagonal elements of $D$.

== Generalizations ==
One can generalize further by allowing the entries to lie in a ring, rather than in a field. In that case if the non-zero entries are required to be units in the ring, one again obtains a group. On the other hand, if the non-zero entries are only required to be non-zero, but not necessarily invertible, this set of matrices forms a semigroup instead.

One may also schematically allow the non-zero entries to lie in a group G, with the understanding that matrix multiplication will only involve multiplying a single pair of group elements, not "adding" group elements. This is an abuse of notation, since element of matrices being multiplied must allow multiplication and addition, but is suggestive notion for the (formally correct) abstract group $G \wr S_n$ (the wreath product of the group G by the symmetric group).

== Signed permutation group ==
A signed permutation matrix is a generalized permutation matrix whose nonzero entries are ±1, and are the integer generalized permutation matrices with integer inverse.

=== Properties ===
- It is the Coxeter group $B_n$, and has order $2^n n!$.
- It is the symmetry group of the hypercube and (dually) of the cross-polytope.
- Its index 2 subgroup of matrices with determinant equal to their underlying (unsigned) permutation is the Coxeter group $D_n$ and is the symmetry group of the demihypercube.
- It is a subgroup of the orthogonal group.

== Applications ==
=== Monomial representations ===
Monomial matrices occur in representation theory in the context of monomial representations. A monomial representation of a group G is a linear representation ρ : G → GL(n, F) of G (here F is the defining field of the representation) such that the image ρ(G) is a subgroup of the group of monomial matrices.
