= John Rhodes (mathematician) =

American mathematician (born 1937)

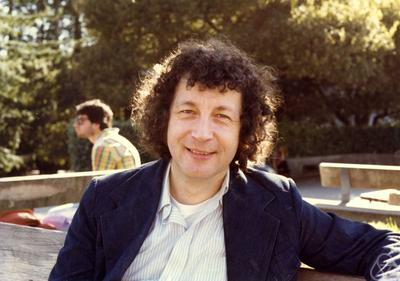
- John Rhodes at Berkeley in 1981
- Born: July 16, 1937 (age 89); Columbus, Ohio, U.S.
- Education: Massachusetts Institute of Technology)
- Known for: Krohn–Rhodes theory
- Scientific career
- Doctoral advisor: Warren Ambrose

John Lewis Rhodes (born July 16, 1937) is an American mathematician known for work in the theory of semigroups, finite-state automata, and algebraic approaches to differential equations.

== Education and career ==
Rhodes was born in Columbus, Ohio, on July 16, 1937, and grew up in Wooster, Ohio, where he founded the Wooster Rocket Society as a teenager. In the fall of 1955, Rhodes entered the Massachusetts Institute of Technology intending to major in physics, but he soon switched to mathematics, earning his B.S. in 1960 and his Ph.D. in 1962. His Ph.D. thesis, co-written with a graduate student from Harvard, Kenneth Krohn, became known as the Prime Decomposition Theorem, or more simply the Krohn–Rhodes Theorem. After a year on an NSF fellowship in Paris, he became a member of the Department of Mathematics at the University of California, Berkeley, where he spent his entire teaching career.

In the late 1960s, Rhodes wrote Applications of Automata Theory and Algebra: Via the Mathematical Theory of Complexity to Biology, Physics, Psychology, Philosophy, and Games, informally known as The Wild Book, which quickly became an underground classic, but remained in typescript until its revision and editing by Chrystopher L. Nehaniv in 2009. The following year Springer published his and his student Benjamin Steinberg's book, The q-Theory of Finite Semigroups, both a history of the field and the fruit of eight years' development of finite semigroup theory.

In recent years Rhodes brought semigroups into matroid theory. In 2015, he published, with Pedro V. Silva, the results of his current work in another monograph with Springer, Boolean Representations of Simplicial Complexes and Matroids.

== Books and Monographs ==
- John Rhodes and Benjamin Steinberg (2008), The q-theory of finite semigroups. Springer Verlag. ISBN 978-0-387-09780-0.
- "The Wild Book", published as Applications of Automata Theory and Algebra via the Mathematical Theory of Complexity to Biology, Physics, Psychology, Philosophy, and Games. John Rhodes; Chrystopher L. Nehaniv (Ed.) (2009), World Scientific. ISBN 978-981-283-696-0
- John Rhodes and Pedro V. Silva (2015), Boolean Representations of Simplicial Complexes and Matroids. Springer Verlag. ISBN 978-3-319-15114-4

== See also ==
- Krohn–Rhodes theory
