= Warren Ambrose =

American mathematician

- Born: October 25, 1914; Virden, Illinois
- Died: December 4, 1995 (aged 81); Paris, France
- Education: University of Illinois at Urbana–Champaign
- Known for: Ambrose–Singer holonomy theorem
- Awards: John Simon Guggenheim Fellow (1947)
- Scientific career
- Fields: differential geometry, partial differential equations, probability theory
- Workplaces: Massachusetts Institute of Technology; University of Buenos Aires
- Thesis: Some Properties of Measurable Stochastic Processes (1939)
- Doctoral advisor: Joseph L. Doob

Warren Arthur Ambrose (October 25, 1914 – December 4, 1995) was Professor Emeritus of Mathematics at the Massachusetts Institute of Technology and at the University of Buenos Aires.

He was born in Virden, Illinois in 1914. He received his bachelor of science degree in 1935, his master's in 1936 and his Ph.D. in 1939, all from the University of Illinois at Urbana–Champaign.

== Personal life ==
Warren Ambrose was a food and wine connoisseur, and also a fan of jazz saxophone player, Charlie "Bird" Parker. He is noted for his work with MIT colleague, Isadore Singer, both of whom helped to shape the pure mathematics department at MIT. He retired from teaching at MIT in 1985, thereafter moving to France. Ambrose died in 1995 in Paris. He was survived by his wife, Jeannette (Grillet) Ambrose of Paris, two children from an earlier marriage, Adam Ambrose of Bisbee, AZ, and Ellen Ambrose of Laurel, MD, and four grandchildren, David and Adam Holzsager, Ari Ambrose, and Jennifer Laurent.

== Career ==
Ambrose became an assistant professor at MIT in 1947, an associate professor in 1950 and full professor in 1957. He was several times between 1939 and 1959 a visiting scholar at the Institute for Advanced Study in Princeton, New Jersey. Ambrose is often considered one of the fathers of modern geometry. He is noted for making changes in the pure mathematics undergraduate curriculum at MIT to reflect recent findings in differential geometry. For example, less than ten years after André Weil presented the differential form, Ambrose was using it in his undergraduate differential geometry courses. In the 1950s, Ambrose (together with I. M. Singer) made MIT into the only center in geometry in the United States outside the University of Chicago. His influence continued through his students, in particular Hung-Hsi Wu and John Rhodes, both of the University of California, Berkeley. In the 1960s Ambrose was a visiting professor at the University of Buenos Aires, Argentina. He is noted for his opposition of takeover of South American countries military regimes, specifically Argentina.

== Political activism ==
In the summer of 1966, while a visiting professor at the University of Buenos Aires in Argentina, Ambrose was severely beaten along with Argentinian faculty members and students by Argentinian military police. This occurred shortly after a military regime took over public universities in Argentina. Ambrose responded by bringing several of the best and brightest students from the University of Buenos Aires back to MIT with him. Ambrose is often renowned amongst Latin American intellectuals for bringing attention to right-wing dictatorships in South America.

In 1967, Ambrose signed a letter declaring his intention to refuse to pay taxes in protest against the U.S. war against Vietnam, and urging other people to also take this stand.
