= Generalized symmetric group =

Wreath product of cyclic group m and symmetrical group n

In mathematics, the generalized symmetric group is the wreath product $S(m,n) := C_m \wr S_n$ of the cyclic group of order m and the symmetric group of order n.

== Examples ==
- For $m=1,$ the generalized symmetric group is exactly the ordinary symmetric group: $S(1,n) = S_n.$
- For $m=2,$ one can consider the cyclic group of order 2 as positives and negatives ($C_2 \cong \{\pm 1\}$) and identify the generalized symmetric group $S(2,n)$ with the signed symmetric group.

== Representation theory ==
There is a natural representation of elements of $S(m,n)$ as generalized permutation matrices, where the nonzero entries are m-th roots of unity: $C_m \cong \mu_m.$

The representation theory has been studied since (Osima 1954); see references in (Can 1996). As with the symmetric group, the representations can be constructed in terms of Specht modules; see (Can 1996).

== Homology ==
The first group homology group – concretely, the abelianization – is $C_m \times C_2$ (for m odd this is isomorphic to $C_{2m}$): the $C_m$ factors (which are all conjugate, hence must map identically in an abelian group, since conjugation is trivial in an abelian group) can be mapped to $C_m$ (concretely, by taking the product of all the $C_m$ values), while the sign map on the symmetric group yields the $C_2.$ These are independent, and generate the group, hence are the abelianization.

The second homology group – in classical terms, the Schur multiplier – is given by (Davies & Morris 1974):

$$H_2(S(2k+1,n)) = \begin{cases} 1 & n < 4\\
\mathbf{Z}/2 & n \geq 4.\end{cases}$$
$$H_2(S(2k+2,n)) = \begin{cases} 1 & n = 0, 1\\
\mathbf{Z}/2 & n = 2\\
(\mathbf{Z}/2)^2 & n = 3\\
(\mathbf{Z}/2)^3 & n \geq 4.
\end{cases}$$

Note that it depends on n and the parity of m: $H_2(S(2k+1,n)) \approx H_2(S(1,n))$ and $H_2(S(2k+2,n)) \approx H_2(S(2,n)),$ which are the Schur multipliers of the symmetric group and signed symmetric group.
