= Peter Dembowski =

German mathematician (1928–1971)

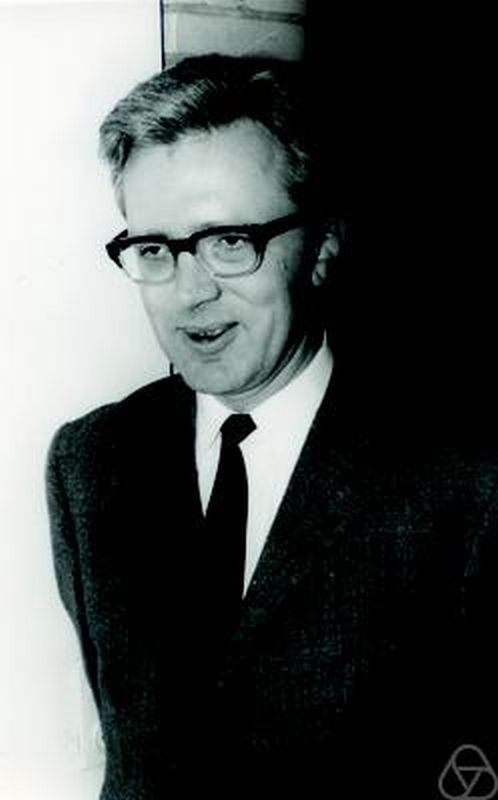
Peter Dembowski 1969 in Erlangen

Heinz Peter Dembowski (1 April 1928, Berlin – 28 January 1971, Tübingen) was a German mathematician, specializing in combinatorics. He is known for the Dembowski-Wagner theorem and for Dembowski-Ostrom polynomials.

== Education and career ==
Dembowski studied from 1948 to 1953 at Goethe University Frankfurt. He then spent three years in the USA first at Brown University and then at the University of Illinois at Urbana–Champaign. At Illinois he met Reinhold Baer, with whom he returned to Frankfurt in 1956 and received in 1957 his doctorate with thesis Verallgemeinerungen von Transitivitätsklassen endlicher projektiver Ebenen (Generalizations of Transitive Classes of Finite Projective Planes). In 1964 Dembowski was habilitated in Frankfurt. He was a visiting professor in 1962/3 at Queen Mary College in London, in 1965/66 at the University of Wisconsin–Madison, and in 1966/67 at the University of Illinois at Chicago. He was in the spring of 1965 a visiting professor at the University of Rome. In 1969 he was appointed to a professorial chair at the University of Tübingen, where he remained until his death in 1971.

The primary focus of Dembowski's research was finite geometries and their interrelations with group theory, about which he wrote an authoritative textbook. He proved the theorem, famous in finite geometry, that every inversive plane of even order n is isomorphic to the system of points and plane sections of an ovoid in a three-dimensional projective space over GF(n).

In 1962 he was an approved speaker (but not an invited speaker) with half-hour talk Partial planes with parallelism at the International Congress of Mathematicians in Stockholm.

His doctoral students include William Kantor.

== Selected publications ==
- Kombinatorik. BI Hochschultaschenbücher 1970.
- Finite Geometries. Springer 1968, Ergebnisse der Mathematik und ihrer Grenzgebiete, reprinted in 1997 in Springer's series Classics of Mathematics, ISBN 3-540-61786-8. 1997 reprint
- Endliche Geometrien. In: Mathematisch-Physikalische Semesterberichte. vol. 13, 1966, p. 32.
