= Monomial representation =

Type of linear representation of a group

In the mathematical fields of representation theory and group theory, a linear representation $\rho$ (rho) of a group $G$ is a monomial representation if there is a finite-index subgroup $H$ and a one-dimensional linear representation $\sigma$ of $H$, such that $\rho$ is equivalent to the induced representation $\mathrm{Ind}_H^{G_\sigma}$.

Alternatively, one may define it as a representation whose image is in the monomial matrices.

Here for example $G$ and $H$ may be finite groups, so that induced representation has a classical sense. The monomial representation is only a little more complicated than the permutation representation of $G$ on the cosets of $H$. It is necessary only to keep track of scalars coming from $\sigma$ applied to elements of $H$.

== Definition ==
To define the monomial representation, we first need to introduce the notion of monomial space. A monomial space is a triple $(V,X,(V_x)_{x\in X})$ where $V$ is a finite-dimensional complex vector space, $X$ is a finite set and $(V_x)_{x\in X}$ is a family of one-dimensional subspaces of $V$ such that $V=\oplus_{x\in X}V_x$.

Now Let $G$ be a group, the monomial representation of $G$ on $V$ is a group homomorphism $\rho:G\to \mathrm{GL}(V)$ such that for every element $g\in G$, $\rho(g)$ permutes the $V_x$'s, this means that $\rho$ induces an action by permutation of $G$ on $X$.
