= Wreath product =

Construction in group theory

In group theory, the wreath product is a special combination of two groups based on the semidirect product. It is formed by the action of one group on many copies of another group, somewhat analogous to exponentiation. Wreath products are used in the classification of permutation groups and also provide a way of constructing interesting examples of groups.

Given two groups $A$ and $H$ (sometimes known as the bottom and top), there exist two variants of the wreath product: the unrestricted wreath product $A \text{ Wr } H$ and the restricted wreath product $A \text{ wr } H$. The general form, denoted by $A \text{ Wr}_{\Omega} H$ or $A \text{ wr}_{\Omega} H$ respectively, requires that $H$ acts on some set $\Omega$; when unspecified, usually $\Omega = H$ (a regular wreath product), though a different $\Omega$ is sometimes implied. The two variants coincide when $A$, $H$, and $\Omega$ are all finite. Either variant is also denoted as $A \wr H$ (with \wr for the LaTeX symbol) or A ≀ H (Unicode U+2240).

The notion generalizes to semigroups and, as such, is a central construction in the Krohn–Rhodes structure theory of finite semigroups.

== Definition ==
Let $A$ be a group and let $H$ be a group acting on a set $\Omega$ (on the left). The direct product $A^{\Omega}$ of $A$ with itself indexed by $\Omega$ is the set of sequences $\overline{a} = (a_{\omega})_{\omega \in \Omega}$ in $A$, indexed by $\Omega$, with a group operation given by pointwise multiplication. The action of $H$ on $\Omega$ can be extended to an action on $A^{\Omega}$ by reindexing, namely by defining

$$h \cdot (a_{\omega})_{\omega \in \Omega} := (a_{h^{-1} \cdot \omega})_{\omega \in \Omega}$$

for all $h \in H$ and all $(a_{\omega})_{\omega \in \Omega} \in A^{\Omega}$.

Then the unrestricted wreath product $A \text{ Wr}_{\Omega} H$ of $A$ by $H$ is the semidirect product $A^{\Omega} \rtimes H$ with the action of $H$ on $A^{\Omega}$ given above. The subgroup $A^{\Omega}$ of $A^{\Omega} \rtimes H$ is called the base of the wreath product.

The restricted wreath product $A \text{ wr}_{\Omega} H$ is constructed in the same way as the unrestricted wreath product except that one uses the direct sum as the base of the wreath product. In this case, the base consists of all sequences in $A^{\Omega}$ with finitely many non-identity entries. The two definitions coincide when $\Omega$ is finite.

In the most common case, $\Omega = H$, and $H$ acts on itself by left multiplication. In this case, the unrestricted and restricted wreath product may be denoted by $A \text{ Wr } H$ and $A \text{ wr } H$ respectively. This is called the regular wreath product.

== Notation and conventions ==
The structure of the wreath product of $A$ by $H$ depends on the $H$-set $\Omega$, and in case $\Omega$ is infinite, it also depends on whether one uses the restricted or unrestricted wreath product.

In the literature, $A\wr_\Omega H$ may stand for the unrestricted wreath product $A\operatorname{Wr}_\Omega H$ or the restricted wreath product $A\operatorname{wr}_\Omega H$. Moreover, the $H$-set $\Omega$ may be omitted from the notation even if $\Omega\neq H$.

In the special case that $H=S_n$ is the symmetric group of degree $n$, it is often implied that $\Omega=\{1,\dots,n\}$ (with the natural action of $S_n$) and then omit $\Omega$ from the notation. That is, $A\wr S_n$ commonly denotes $A\wr_{\{1,\dots,n\}} S_n$ instead of the regular wreath product $A\wr_{S_n} S_n$. In the first case, the base group is the product of $n$ copies of $A$, in the latter it is the product of $n!$ copies of $A$.

== Properties ==
Since the finite direct product is the same as the finite direct sum of groups, it follows that the unrestricted wreath product $A\operatorname{Wr}_\Omega H$ and the restricted wreath product $A\operatorname{wr}_\Omega H$ are equal if $\Omega$ is finite. In particular, this is true when $\Omega = H$ and $H$ is finite. In any case, $A\operatorname{wr}_\Omega H$ is always a subgroup of $A\operatorname{Wr}_\Omega H$.

=== Cardinality ===
If $A$, $H$ and $\Omega$ are finite, then $|A\wr_\Omega\! H| = |A|^{|\Omega|}|H|$.

=== Universal embedding theorem ===
If $G$ is an extension of $A$ by $H$, then there exists a subgroup of the unrestricted wreath product $A\wr H$ which is isomorphic to $G$. This is also known as the Krasner–Kaloujnine embedding theorem. The Krohn–Rhodes theorem involves what is basically the semigroup equivalent of this.

== Canonical actions of wreath products ==
If the group $A$ acts on a set $\Lambda$ then there are two canonical ways to construct sets from $\Omega$ and $\Lambda$ on which $A\operatorname{Wr}_\Omega H$ (and therefore also $A\operatorname{wr}_\Omega H$) can act.

- The imprimitive wreath product action on $\Lambda\times\Omega$:
  If $((a_\omega), h)\in A \operatorname{Wr}_\Omega H$ and $(\lambda,\omega')\in \Lambda\times \Omega$, then
  $$((a_\omega), h) \cdot (\lambda,\omega') := (a_{h(\omega')}\lambda, h\omega').$$
- The primitive wreath product action on $\Lambda^\Omega$:
  An element in $\Lambda^\Omega$ is a sequence $(\lambda_\omega)$ indexed by the $H$-set $\Omega$. Given an element $((a_\omega), h)\in A \operatorname{Wr}_\Omega H$, its operation on $(\lambda_\omega) \in \Lambda^\Omega$ is given by
  $$((a_\omega), h) \cdot (\lambda_\omega) :=  (a_{h^{-1}\omega}\lambda_{h^{-1}\omega}).$$

== Examples ==
The generalized symmetric group is $C_m \wr S_n$. The base of this wreath product is the $n$-fold direct product $C_m^n = C_m\times\cdots\times C_m$, where the action $\phi : S_n \to \operatorname{Aut}(C_m^n)$ of the symmetric group $S_n$ is given by $\phi(\sigma)(\alpha_1,\dots,\alpha_n)=(\alpha_{\sigma(1)},\dots,\alpha_{\sigma(n)})$.

As a special case of the above, we have the hyperoctahedral groups $C_2 \wr S_n$. Setting $n=2$ gives $C_2 \wr C_2$, which is isomorphic to the dihedral group of order 8 (the symmetry group of the square). It is the smallest non-trivial wreath product.

The lamplighter group is the restricted wreath product $C_2 \wr \Z$.

Let $p$ be a prime and let $n \geq 1$. Let $P$ be a Sylow p-subgroup of the symmetric group $S_{p^n}$. Then $P$ is isomorphic to the iterated regular wreath product $W_n = C_p \wr \cdots \wr C_p$ of $n$ copies of $C_p$. Here $W_1=C_p$ and $W_k=W_{k - 1} \wr C_p$ for all $k \geq 2$. For instance, the Sylow 2-subgroup of $S_4$ is the above $C_2 \wr C_2$ group.

Wreath products arise naturally in the symmetries of complete rooted trees and their graphs. For example, the repeated (iterated) wreath product $S_2\wr S_2\wr\cdots\wr S_2$ is the automorphism group of a complete binary tree.

=== Logic and combination puzzles ===
The Rubik's Cube group is a normal subgroup of index 12 in the product of wreath products $(C_3 \wr S_8) \times (C_2 \wr S_{12})$, the factors corresponding to the symmetries of the 8 corners and 12 edges.

The group of Sudoku validity-preserving transformations contains the double wreath product $(S_3\wr S_3)\wr S_2$, where the factors are the permutation of rows/columns within a 3-row or 3-column band or stack ($S_3$), the permutation of the bands/stacks themselves ($S_3$) and the transposition, which interchanges the bands and stacks ($S_2$). Here, the two index sets $\Omega_1,\Omega_2$ are firstly the set of bands (resp. stacks), so $|\Omega_1|=3$, and secondly the set {bands, stacks} (so $|\Omega_2|=2$). Accordingly, $|S_3\wr S_3|=|S_3|^3|S_3|=6^4$ and $|(S_3\wr S_3)\wr S_2|=|S_3\wr S_3|^2|S_2|=6^8\times 2$.
