= William Kantor =

American mathematician

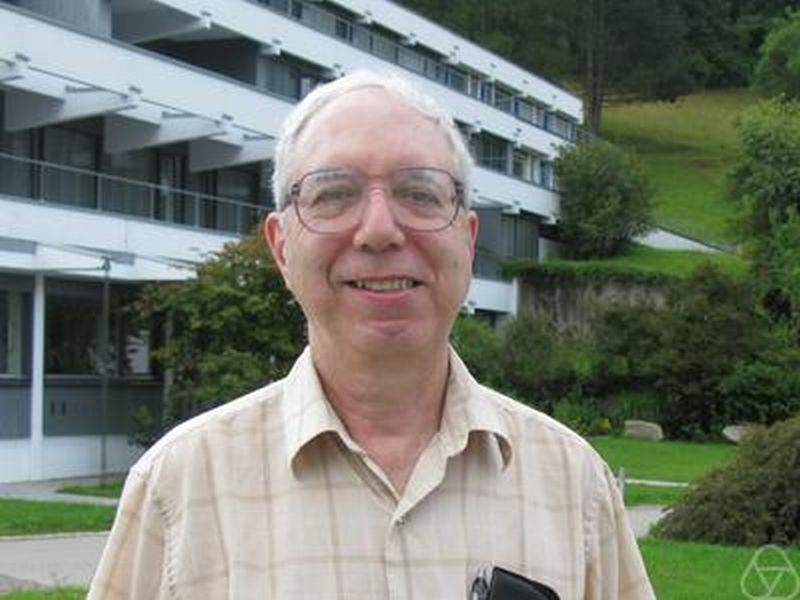
- William Kantor in Oberwolfach 2011
- Born: William M. Kantor; September 19, 1944 (age 82)
- Other name: Bill Kantor
- Scientific career
- Fields: Mathematics
- Workplaces: University of Oregon, University of Illinois at Chicago
- Thesis: 2-transitive symmetric designs (1968)
- Doctoral advisors: Peter Dembowski, Richard Hubert Bruck
- Notable students: Mark Ronan
- Website: https://pages.uoregon.edu/kantor/

William M. Kantor (born September 19, 1944) is an American mathematician who works in finite group theory and finite geometries, particularly in computational aspects of these subjects.

== Education and career ==
Kantor graduated with a bachelor's degree from Brooklyn College in 1964. He went on to graduate studies at the University of Wisconsin, receiving his PhD in 1968 under the supervision of Peter Dembowski and R. H. Bruck. He then worked at the University of Illinois at Chicago from 1968 to 1971 before moving in 1971 to the University of Oregon, where he remained for the rest of his career.

Kantor's research mostly involves finite groups, often in relation to finite geometries and computation. Algorithms developed by him have found use, for example, in the GAP computer algebra system.

Kantor has written over 170 papers, and has advised 7 PhD students.

== Significant publications ==
=== Books and monographs ===
- Kantor, W. M. (1979). Classical groups from a nonclassical viewpoint. Oxford University, Mathematical Institute, Oxford. MR 0578539.
- Kantor, William M.; Seress, Ákos (2001). "Black box classical groups". Memoirs of the American Mathematical Society. 149 (708): 0. doi:10.1090/memo/0708. ISSN 0065-9266. MR 1804385.

=== Journal articles ===
- Calderbank, R.; Kantor, W. M. (1986). "The Geometry of Two-Weight Codes". Bulletin of the London Mathematical Society. 18 (2): 97–122. doi:10.1112/blms/18.2.97. ISSN 0024-6093. MR 0818812.
- Kantor, William M.; Lubotzky, Alexander (1990). "The probability of generating a finite classical group". Geometriae Dedicata. 36 (1). doi:10.1007/BF00181465. ISSN 0046-5755. MR 1065213. S2CID 6771.
- Kantor, William M. (1985). "Homogeneous designs and geometric lattices". Journal of Combinatorial Theory, Series A. 38 (1): 66–74. doi:10.1016/0097-3165(85)90022-6. ISSN 0097-3165. MR 0773556.

== Awards and honors ==
- In 2013, Kantor was named a fellow of the American Mathematical Society as a member of the inaugural class of fellows.
- In 2004, a conference "Finite geometries, groups, and computation" was held in honor of Kantor's 60th birthday.
- In 1998, Kantor gave an invited talk at the International Congress of Mathematicians in Berlin.
