= Anne C. Morel =

American mathematician

Anne C. Morel (also published as Anne C. Davis, died July 22, 1984) was an American mathematician known for her work in logic, order theory, and algebra. She was the first female full professor of mathematics at the University of Washington.

== Education and career ==
Morel graduated in 1941 from the University of California, Los Angeles. She began graduate study in mathematics in 1942 at the University of California, Berkeley, but left her studies to serve in the WAVES (the United States Naval Women's Reserve) during World War II. She returned to her studies in Berkeley in 1946, and completed her Ph.D. in 1953. Her dissertation, A Study in the Arithmetic of Order Types, was supervised by Alfred Tarski, and concerned ordinal arithmetic.

After two years as an assistant professor at Berkeley, and positions at the University of California, Davis and the Institute for Advanced Study (1959–1960), she joined the mathematics faculty at the University of Washington in 1960, and became a tenured associate professor there in 1961. Eventually she became the first female full professor of mathematics there, and for many years she was the university's only female professor of mathematics.

== Research contributions ==
As part of her thesis work, in 1952, Morel found two different countable order types whose squares are equal. After Wacław Sierpiński simplified her construction, they published it jointly.^{[A]}

In 1955, Morel published a converse to the Knaster–Tarski theorem, according to which every incomplete lattice has an increasing function with no fixed point.^{[B]}

Her 1965 paper with Thomas Frayne and Dana Scott, "Reduced direct products", provides the main definitions of reduced products in model theory. It was published after several important applications of those definitions had already been discovered, and has been called a "classical reference paper".^{[E]} Her only publication with her advisor, Alfred Tarski, was a brief announcement of related research using reduced products in connection with the compactness theorem in mathematical logic.^{[C]} Among other results, it provided a proof of the compactness theorem using ultraproducts. With Chen Chung Chang, she also used reduced products to show that a sufficient condition for properties to be preserved under direct products, derived by Alfred Horn, was not also a necessary condition.^{[D]}

Topics in her later research included group theory, semigroups, and cofinality in universal algebra. Her final publication, published posthumously, was "Cofinality of algebras" (1986).^{[F]}

== Personal life ==
During her war service, Morel met and married Alan Davis, another mathematician. However, their marriage was not successful, and Davis took a position at the University of Nevada, Reno while Morel returned to her studies at UC Berkeley. They divorced in 1955.

In Berkeley, Morel began an affair with her advisor Alfred Tarski in 1950, at approximately the same time as another student mistress of Tarski, Wanda Szmielew, left Berkeley to return to Poland. Tarski was married, to Maria Witkowska (whom he had married in 1929), but when Morel divorced her husband Alan Davis in 1955, Tarski offered to divorce Maria and marry Morel instead. However, she turned him down. Instead, in 1957, she married Delos Morel, a lawyer. Although the Morels and the Tarskis remained on friendly terms until at least 1960, Morel eventually came to view Tarski's treatment of his other female students as "taking advantage of his position of power in a way she now viewed as unacceptable".

The Morels had two daughters, Jeanne (born 1958) and Verena (1962–2002). Morel died on July 22, 1984. Her husband Delos became the Chief Administrative Law Judge on the Washington State Board of Industrial Insurance Appeals, and died in 2008.

== Selected publications ==
A.	Davis, Anne C.; Sierpiński, Waclaw (1952), "Sur les types d'ordre distincts dont les carrés sont égaux", Comptes Rendus de l'Académie des Sciences, 235: 850–852

B.	Davis, Anne C. (1955), "A characterization of complete lattices", Pacific Journal of Mathematics, 5 (2): 311–319, doi:10.2140/pjm.1955.5.311

C.	Morel, A. C.; Scott, D. S.; Tarski, Alfred (November 1958), "Reduced products and the compactness theorem" (PDF), Notices of the American Mathematical Society, 5 (6): 674–675

D.	Chang, C. C.; Morel, Anne C. (1958), "On closure under direct product", The Journal of Symbolic Logic, 23 (2): 149–154, doi:10.2307/2964395, JSTOR 2964395

E.	Frayne, T.; Morel, A. C.; Scott, D. S. (1962), "Reduced direct products", Fundamenta Mathematicae, 51 (3): 195–228, doi:10.4064/fm-51-3-195-228

F.	Gould, Matthew; Morel, Anne C.; Tsinakis, Constantine (1986), "Cofinality of algebras", Algebra Universalis, 22 (2–3): 253–278, doi:10.1007/BF01224031, S2CID 122071730
