= Subdirectly irreducible algebra =

In the branch of mathematics known as universal algebra (and in its applications), a subdirectly irreducible algebra is an algebra that cannot be factored as a subdirect product of "simpler" algebras. Subdirectly irreducible algebras play a somewhat analogous role in algebra to primes in number theory.

== Definition ==
A universal algebra A is said to be subdirectly irreducible when A has more than one element, and when any subdirect representation of A includes (as a factor) an algebra isomorphic to A, with the isomorphism being given by the projection map.

== Examples ==
- The two-element chain, as either a Boolean algebra, a Heyting algebra, a lattice, or a semilattice, is subdirectly irreducible. In fact, the two-element chain is the only subdirectly irreducible distributive lattice.
- Any finite chain with two or more elements, as a Heyting algebra, is subdirectly irreducible. (This is not the case for chains of three or more elements as either lattices or semilattices, which are subdirectly reducible to the two-element chain. The difference with Heyting algebras is that a → b need not be comparable with a under the lattice order even when b is.)
- Any finite cyclic group of order a power of a prime (i.e. any cyclic p-group) is subdirectly irreducible. (One weakness of the analogy between subdirect irreducibles and prime numbers is that the integers are subdirectly representable by any infinite family of nonisomorphic prime-power cyclic groups, e.g. just those of order a Mersenne prime assuming there are infinitely many.) In fact, an abelian group is subdirectly irreducible if and only if it is isomorphic to a cyclic p-group or isomorphic to a Prüfer group (an infinite but countable p-group, which is the direct limit of its finite p-subgroups).
- A vector space is subdirectly irreducible if and only if it has dimension one.

== Properties ==
The subdirect representation theorem of universal algebra states that every algebra is subdirectly representable by its subdirectly irreducible quotients. An equivalent definition of "subdirect irreducible" therefore is any algebra A that is not subdirectly representable by those of its quotients not isomorphic to A. (This is not quite the same thing as "by its proper quotients" because a proper quotient of A may be isomorphic to A, for example the quotient of the semilattice (Z, min) obtained by identifying just the two elements 3 and 4.)

An immediate corollary is that any variety, as a class closed under homomorphisms, subalgebras, and direct products, is determined by its subdirectly irreducible members, since every algebra A in the variety can be constructed as a subalgebra of a suitable direct product of the subdirectly irreducible quotients of A, all of which belong to the variety because A does. For this reason one often studies not the variety itself but just its subdirect irreducibles.

An algebra A is subdirectly irreducible if and only if it contains two elements that are identified by every proper quotient, equivalently, if and only if its lattice Con A of congruences has a least nonidentity element. That is, any subdirect irreducible must contain a specific pair of elements witnessing its irreducibility in this way. Given such a witness (a, b) to subdirect irreducibility we say that the subdirect irreducible is (a, b)-irreducible.

Given any class C of similar algebras, Jónsson's lemma (due to Bjarni Jónsson) states that if the variety HSP(C) generated by C is congruence-distributive, its subdirect irreducibles are in HSP_{U}(C), that is, they are quotients of subalgebras of ultraproducts of members of C. (If C is a finite set of finite algebras, the ultraproduct operation is redundant.)

== Applications ==
A necessary and sufficient condition for a Heyting algebra to be subdirectly irreducible is for there to be a greatest element strictly below 1. The witnessing pair is that element and 1, and identifying any other pair a, b of elements identifies both a→b and b→a with 1 thereby collapsing everything above those two implications to 1. Hence every finite chain of two or more elements as a Heyting algebra is subdirectly irreducible.

By Jónsson's Lemma, subdirectly irreducible algebras of a congruence-distributive variety generated by a finite set of finite algebras are no larger than the generating algebras, since the quotients and subalgebras of an algebra A are never larger than A itself. For example, the subdirect irreducibles in the variety generated by a finite linearly ordered Heyting algebra H must be just the nondegenerate quotients of H, namely all smaller linearly ordered nondegenerate Heyting algebras. The conditions cannot be dropped in general: for example, the variety of all Heyting algebras is generated by the set of its finite subdirectly irreducible algebras, but there exist subdirectly irreducible Heyting algebras of arbitrary (infinite) cardinality. There also exists a single finite algebra generating a (non-congruence-distributive) variety with arbitrarily large subdirect irreducibles.
