= Quasivariety =

In mathematics, a quasivariety is a class of algebraic structures generalizing the notion of variety by allowing equational conditions on the axioms defining the class.

== Definition ==
A trivial algebra contains just one element. A quasivariety is a class K of algebras with a specified signature satisfying any of the following equivalent conditions:

1. K is a pseudoelementary class closed under subalgebras and direct products.
2. K is the class of all models of a set of quasi-identities, that is, implications of the form $s_1 \approx t_1 \land \ldots \land s_n \approx t_n \rightarrow s \approx t$, where $s, s_1, \ldots, s_n,t, t_1, \ldots, t_n$ are terms built up from variables using the operation symbols of the specified signature.
3. K contains a trivial algebra and is closed under isomorphisms, subalgebras, and reduced products.
4. K contains a trivial algebra and is closed under isomorphisms, subalgebras, direct products, and ultraproducts.

== Examples ==
Every variety is a quasivariety by virtue of an equation being a quasi-identity for which n = 0.

The cancellative semigroups form a quasivariety.

Let K be a quasivariety. Then the class of orderable algebras from K forms a quasivariety, since the preservation-of-order axioms are Horn clauses.
