= Algebraic =

Algebraic may refer to any subject related to algebra in mathematics and related branches like algebraic number theory and algebraic topology. The word algebra itself has several meanings.

Algebraic may also refer to:

- Algebraic data type, a datatype in computer programming each of whose values is data from other datatypes wrapped in one of the constructors of the datatype
- Algebraic numbers, a complex number that is a root of a non-zero polynomial in one variable with integer coefficients
- Algebraic functions, functions satisfying certain polynomials
- Algebraic element, an element of a field extension which is a root of some polynomial over the base field
- Algebraic extension, a field extension such that every element is an algebraic element over the base field
- Algebraic structure, a set with one or more finitary operations defined on it
- Algebraic, the order of entering operations when using a calculator (contrast reverse Polish notation)
- Algebraic sum, a summation of quantities that takes into account their signs; e.g. the algebraic sum of 4, 3, and -8 is -1.

== See also ==
- Algebra (disambiguation)
- Algebraic notation (disambiguation)
