= Subdirect product =

In mathematics, especially in the areas of abstract algebra known as universal algebra, group theory, ring theory, and module theory, a subdirect product is a subalgebra of a direct product that depends fully on all its factors without however necessarily being the whole direct product. The notion was introduced by Birkhoff in 1944, generalizing Emmy Noether's special case of the idea (and decomposition result) for Noetherian rings, and has proved to be a powerful generalization of the notion of direct product.

== Definition ==
A subdirect product is a subalgebra (in the sense of universal algebra) A of a direct product Π_{i}A_{i} such that every induced projection (the composite p_{j}s: A → A_{j} of a projection p_{j}: Π_{i}A_{i} → A_{j} with the subalgebra inclusion s: A → Π_{i}A_{i}) is surjective.

A direct (subdirect) representation of an algebra A is a direct (subdirect) product isomorphic to A.

An algebra is called subdirectly irreducible if it is not subdirectly representable by "simpler" algebras (formally, if in any subdirect representation, one of the projections is an isomorphism). Subdirect irreducibles are to subdirect product of algebras roughly as primes are to multiplication of integers.

Birkhoff (1944) proved that every algebra all of whose operations are of finite arity is isomorphic to a subdirect product of subdirectly irreducible algebras.

== Examples ==
- Every permutation group is a sub-direct product of its restrictions to its orbits.
- Any distributive lattice L is subdirectly representable as a subalgebra of a direct power of the two-element distributive lattice. This can be viewed as an algebraic formulation of the representability of L as a set of sets closed under the binary operations of union and intersection, via the interpretation of the direct power itself as a power set. In the finite case such a representation is direct (i.e. the whole direct power) if and only if L is a complemented lattice, i.e. a Boolean algebra.
- The same holds for any semilattice when "semilattice" is substituted for "distributive lattice" and "subsemilattice" for "sublattice" throughout the preceding example. That is, every semilattice is representable as a subdirect power of the two-element semilattice.
- The chain of natural numbers together with infinity, as a Heyting algebra, is subdirectly representable as a subalgebra of the direct product of the finite linearly ordered Heyting algebras. The situation with other Heyting algebras is treated in further detail in the article on subdirect irreducibles.
- The group of integers under addition is subdirectly representable by any (necessarily infinite) family of arbitrarily large finite cyclic groups. In this representation, 0 is the sequence of identity elements of the representing groups, 1 is a sequence of generators chosen from the appropriate group, and integer addition and negation are the corresponding group operations in each group applied coordinate-wise. The representation is faithful (no two integers are represented by the same sequence) because of the size requirement, and the projections are onto because every coordinate eventually exhausts its group.
- Every vector space over a given field is subdirectly representable by the one-dimensional space over that field, with the finite-dimensional spaces being directly representable in this way. (For vector spaces, as for abelian groups, direct product with finitely many factors is synonymous with direct sum with finitely many factors, whence subdirect product and subdirect sum are also synonymous for finitely many factors.)
- Subdirect products are used to represent many small perfect groups in (Holt & Plesken 1989).
- Every reduced commutative Noetherian ring is a sub-direct product of integral domains (over a field, this corresponds to the decomposition of a variety into its irreducible components). And more generally every commutative Noetherian ring is a sub-direct product of rings whose only zero-divisors are nilpotent. (Originally proved in Section 6 of Noether (1921).)
- Every commutative reduced ring is a sub-direct product of fields (Lemma 2 of Birkhoff (1944)).

== See also ==
- Semidirect product, another kind of group product
- Goursat's lemma, which classifies subdirect products of two groups
- Classification of 3-factor subdirect products of groups by Neuen & Schweitzer
