= Jan Reiterman =

Czech mathematician and computer scientist

Jan Reiterman (8 October 1948 – 14 September 1992) was a Czech mathematician and computer scientist. He is best known for his contributions to categorical methods in algebra and the eponymous Reiterman's Theorem, which generalized Birkhoff's Variety Theorem to varieties of finite algebras.

== Life ==
Reiterman was born on 8 October 1948 in Prague, Czechoslovakia. He died on 14 September 1992 of lung cancer.
