= Outline of algebra =

The following outline is provided as an overview of and topical guide to algebra:

Algebra is a branch of mathematics that deals with abstract systems, known as algebraic structures, and the manipulation of expressions within those systems. It is a generalization of arithmetic that introduces variables and algebraic operations other than the standard arithmetic operations, such as addition and multiplication.

Elementary algebra is the main form of algebra taught in schools. It examines mathematical statements using variables for unspecified values and seeks to determine for which values the statements are true. To do so, it uses different methods of transforming equations to isolate variables. Linear algebra is a closely related field that investigates linear equations and combinations of them called systems of linear equations. It provides methods to find the values that solve all equations in the system at the same time, and to study the set of these solutions.

== Branches ==
- Pre-algebra
- Elementary algebra
- Boolean algebra
- Abstract algebra
- Linear algebra
- Universal algebra

== Algebraic equations ==
An algebraic equation is an equation involving only algebraic expressions in the unknowns. These are further classified by degree.

- Linear equation – algebraic equation of degree one.
- Polynomial equation – equation in which a polynomial is set equal to another polynomial.
- Transcendental equation – equation involving a transcendental function of one of its variables.
- Functional equation – equation in which the unknowns are functions rather than simple quantities.
- Differential equation – equation involving derivatives.
- Integral equation – equation involving integrals.
- Diophantine equation – equation where the only solutions of interest of the unknowns are the integer ones.

== History ==
- History of algebra

== General algebra concepts ==
- Fundamental theorem of algebra – states that every non-constant single-variable polynomial with complex coefficients has at least one complex root. This includes polynomials with real coefficients, since every real number is a complex number with an imaginary part equal to zero.
- Equations – equality of two mathematical expressions
- Linear equation – an algebraic equation with a degree of one
- Quadratic equation – an algebraic equation with a degree of two
- Cubic equation – an algebraic equation with a degree of three
- Quartic equation – an algebraic equation with a degree of four
- Quintic equation – an algebraic equation with a degree of five
- Polynomial – an algebraic expression consisting of variables and coefficients
- Inequalities – a comparison between values
- Functions – mapping that associates a single output value with each input value
- Sequences – ordered list of elements either finite or infinite
- Systems of equations – finite set of equations
- Vectors – element of a vector space
- Matrix – two dimensional array of numbers
- Vector space – basic algebraic structure of linear algebra
- Field – algebraic structure with addition, multiplication and division
- Groups – algebraic structure with a single binary operation
- Rings – algebraic structure with addition and multiplication

== See also ==
- Table of mathematical symbols
