= Algebra (disambiguation) =

Algebra may refer to:

== Branches of mathematics ==
- Elementary algebra
- Universal algebra
- Abstract algebra
- Linear algebra
- Relational algebra
- Computer algebra
- Homological algebra

== Mathematical structures ==
=== Vector space with multiplication ===
Algebra over a field, or algebra, a vector space equipped with a bilinear vector product.

- In ring theory and linear algebra:
  - Algebra over a commutative ring, a module equipped with a bilinear product. Generalization of algebras over a field
  - Associative algebra, a module equipped with an associative bilinear vector product
  - Superalgebra, a $\mathbb{Z}_2$-graded algebra
  - Lie algebras, Poisson algebras, and Jordan algebras, important examples of (potentially) nonassociative algebras
- In functional analysis:
  - Banach algebra, an associative algebra A over the real or complex numbers which at the same time is also a Banach space
  - Operator algebra, continuous linear operators on a topological vector space with multiplication given by the composition
  - *-algebra, An algebra with a notion of adjoints
    - C*-algebra, a Banach algebra equipped with a unary involution operation
    - Von Neumann algebra (or W*-algebra)
- Coalgebra is the dual notion

=== Other structures ===
A different class of "algebras" consists of objects which generalize logical connectives, sets, and lattices.

- In logic:
  - Relational algebra, in which a set of finitary relations that is closed under certain operators
  - Boolean algebra and Boolean algebra (structure)
  - Heyting algebra
- In measure theory:
  - Algebra over a set, a collection of sets closed under finite unions and complementation
  - Sigma algebra, a collection of sets closed under countable unions and complementation

"Algebra" can also describe more general structures:

- In category theory and computer science:
  - F-algebra and F-coalgebra
  - T-algebra

== Other uses ==
- Algebra Blessett, singer from the U.S. whose stage name is Algebra
- Algebra (book), a textbook by Serge Lang

== See also ==
- Algebraic (disambiguation)
- List of all articles whose title begins with "algebra"
