= Algebraic notation =

Algebraic notation may refer to:

- In mathematics and computers, infix notation, the practice of representing a binary operator and operands with the operator between the two operands (as in "2 + 2")
- Algebraic notation (chess), the standard system for recording movement of pieces in a chess game
- In linguistics, recursive categorical syntax, also known as "algebraic syntax", a theory of how natural languages are structured
- Mathematical notation for algebra
