= Ordered semigroup =

Algebraic structure

In mathematics, an ordered semigroup is a semigroup (S,•) together with a partial order ≤ that is compatible with the semigroup operation, meaning that x ≤ y implies z•x ≤ z•y and x•z ≤ y•z for all x, y, z in S.

An ordered monoid and an ordered group are, respectively, a monoid or a group that are endowed with a partial order that makes them ordered semigroups. The terms posemigroup, pogroup and pomonoid are sometimes used, where "po" is an abbreviation for "partially ordered".

The positive integers, the nonnegative integers and the integers form respectively a posemigroup, a pomonoid, and a pogroup under addition and the natural ordering.

Every semigroup can be considered as a posemigroup endowed with the trivial (discrete) partial order "=".

A morphism or homomorphism of posemigroups is a semigroup homomorphism that preserves the order (equivalently, that is monotonically increasing).

== Category-theoretic interpretation ==
A pomonoid (M, •, 1, ≤) can be considered as a monoidal category that is both skeletal and thin, with an object of for each element of M, a unique morphism from m to n if and only if m ≤ n, the tensor product being given by •, and the unit by 1.
