= Nonstandard integer =

In mathematics, a nonstandard integer may refer to

- Hyperinteger, the integer part of a hyperreal number
- an integer in a non-standard model of arithmetic
