= Algebraic operation =

Mathematical operation

Algebraic operations in the solution to the quadratic equation. The radical sign √, denoting a square root, is equivalent to exponentiation to the power of 1/2. The ± sign means the equation can be written with either a + or a – sign.

In mathematics, a basic algebraic operation is a mathematical operation similar to any one of the common operations of elementary algebra, which include addition, subtraction, multiplication, division, raising to a whole number power, and taking roots (fractional power). The operations of elementary algebra may be performed on numbers, in which case they are often called arithmetic operations. They may also be performed, in a similar way, on variables, algebraic expressions, and more generally, on elements of algebraic structures, such as groups and fields.

An algebraic operation on a set $S$ may be defined more formally as a function that maps to $S$ the tuples of a given length of elements of $S$. The length of the tuples is called the arity of the operation, and each member of the tuple is called an operand. The most common case is the case of arity two, where the operation is called a binary operation and the operands form an ordered pair. A unary operation is an operation of arity one that has only one operand; for example, the square root. An example of a ternary operation (arity three) is the triple product.

The term algebraic operation may also be used for operations that may be defined by compounding basic algebraic operations, such as the dot product. In calculus and mathematical analysis, algebraic operation is also used for the operations that may be defined by purely algebraic methods. For example, exponentiation with an integer or rational exponent is an algebraic operation, but not the general exponentiation with a real or complex exponent. Also, the derivative is an operation that is not algebraic.

== Notation ==
Multiplication symbols are usually omitted, and implied, when there is no operator between two variables or terms, or when a coefficient is used. For example, 3 × x^{2} is written as 3x^{2}, and 2 × x × y is written as 2xy. Sometimes, multiplication symbols are replaced with either a dot or center-dot, so that x × y is written as either x . y or x · y. Plain text, programming languages, and calculators also use a single asterisk to represent the multiplication symbol, and it must be explicitly used; for example, 3x is written as 3 * x.

Rather than using the ambiguous division sign (÷), (Note: In some countries, this symbol indicates subtraction or a wrong answer. ISO 80000-2 advises that it not be used. For more information, see Obelus.) division is usually represented with a vinculum, a horizontal line, as in 3/(x + 1). In plain text and programming languages, a slash (also called a solidus) is used, e.g. 3 / (x + 1).

Exponents are usually formatted using superscripts, as in x^{2}. In plain text, the TeX mark-up language, and some programming languages such as MATLAB and Julia, the caret symbol, ^, represents exponents, so x^{2} is written as x ^ 2. In programming languages such as Ada, Fortran, Perl, Python and Ruby, a double asterisk is used, so x^{2} is written as x ** 2.

The plus–minus sign, ±, is used as a shorthand notation for two expressions written as one, representing one expression with a plus sign, the other with a minus sign. For example, y = x ± 1 represents the two equations y = x + 1 and y = x − 1. Sometimes, it is used for denoting a positive-or-negative term such as ±x.

== Arithmetic vs algebraic operations ==
Algebraic operations work in the same way as arithmetic operations, as can be seen in the table below.

Operation	Arithmetic Example	Algebra Example	Comments ≡ means "equivalent to" ≢ means "not equivalent to"
Addition	$(5 \times 5) + 5 + 5 + 3$ equivalent to: $5^2 + (2 \times 5) + 3$	$(b \times b) + b + b + a$ equivalent to: $b^2 + 2b + a$	$$\begin{align} 2 \times b & \equiv 2b\\ b + b + b & \equiv 3b\\ b \times b & \equiv b^2 \end{align}$$
Subtraction	$(7 \times 7) - 7 - 5$ equivalent to: $7^2 - 7 - 5$	$(b \times b) - b - a$ equivalent to: $b^2 - b - a$	$$\begin{align}b^2 - b & \not\equiv b\\ 3b - b & \equiv 2b\\ b^2 - b & \equiv b(b-1)\end{align}$$
Multiplication	$3 \times 5$ or $3 \ .\ 5$ or $3 \cdot 5$ or $(3)(5)$	$a \times b$ or $a . b$ or $a \cdot b$ or $ab$	$a \times a \times a$ is the same as $a^3$
Division	$12 \div 4$ or $12 / 4$ or $\frac{12}{4}$	$b \div a$ or $b / a$ or $\frac{b}{a}$	$\frac{a+b}{3} \equiv \tfrac{1}{3} \times (a+b)$
Exponentiation	$3^{\frac{1}{2}}$ $2^3$	$a^{\frac{1}{2}}$ $b^3$	$a^{\frac{1}{2}}$ is the same as $\sqrt a$ $b^3$ is the same as $b \times b \times b$

Note: the use of the letters $a$ and $b$ is arbitrary, and the examples would have been equally valid if $x$ and $y$ were used.

== Properties of arithmetic and algebraic operations ==
Property	Arithmetic Example	Algebra Example	Comments ≡ means "equivalent to" ≢ means "not equivalent to"
Commutativity	$3 + 5 = 5 + 3$ $3 \times 5 = 5 \times 3$	$a + b = b + a$ $a \times b = b \times a$	Addition and multiplication are commutative and associative. Subtraction and division are not: e.g. $a - b \not\equiv b - a$
Associativity	$(3 + 5) + 7 = 3 + (5 + 7)$ $(3 \times 5) \times 7 = 3 \times (5 \times 7)$	$(a + b) + c = a + (b + c)$ $(a \times b) \times c = a \times (b \times c)$	Addition and multiplication are commutative and associative. Subtraction and division are not: e.g. $a - b \not\equiv b - a$

== See also ==
- Algebraic expression
- Algebraic function
- Elementary algebra
- Factoring a quadratic expression
- Order of operations
