= Reduced product =

In model theory, a branch of mathematical logic, and in algebra, the reduced product is a construction that generalizes both direct product and ultraproduct.

Let {S_{i} | i ∈ I} be a nonempty family of structures of the same signature σ indexed by a set I, and let U be a proper filter on I. The domain of the reduced product is the quotient of the Cartesian product

$$\prod_{i \in I} S_i$$

by a certain equivalence relation ~: two elements (a_{i}) and (b_{i}) of the Cartesian product are equivalent if

$$\left\{ i \in I: a_i = b_i \right\}\in U$$

If U only contains I as an element, the equivalence relation is trivial, and the reduced product is just the direct product. If U is an ultrafilter, the reduced product is an ultraproduct.

Operations from σ are interpreted on the reduced product by applying the operation pointwise. Relations are interpreted by

$$R((a^1_i)/{\sim},\dots,(a^n_i)/{\sim}) \iff \{i\in I\mid R^{S_i}(a^1_i,\dots,a^n_i)\}\in U.$$

For example, if each structure is a vector space, then the reduced product is a vector space with addition defined as (a + b)_{i} = a_{i} + b_{i} and multiplication by a scalar c as (ca)_{i} = c a_{i}.
