= Quasi-identity =

Type of Horn clause, a generalization of identities

In universal algebra, a quasi-identity is an implication of the form

s_{1} = t_{1} ∧ … ∧ s_{n} = t_{n} → s = t

where s_{1}, ..., s_{n}, t_{1}, ..., t_{n}, s, and t are terms built up from variables using the operation symbols of the specified signature.

A quasi-identity amounts to a conditional equation for which the conditions themselves are equations. Alternatively, it can be seen as a disjunction of inequations and one equation s_{1} ≠ t_{1} ∨ ... ∨ s_{n} ≠ t_{n} ∨ s = t—that is, as a definite Horn clause. A quasi-identity with n = 0 is an ordinary identity or equation, so quasi-identities are a generalization of identities.

== See also ==
- Quasivariety
