= Alfred Horn =

American mathematician (1918–2001)

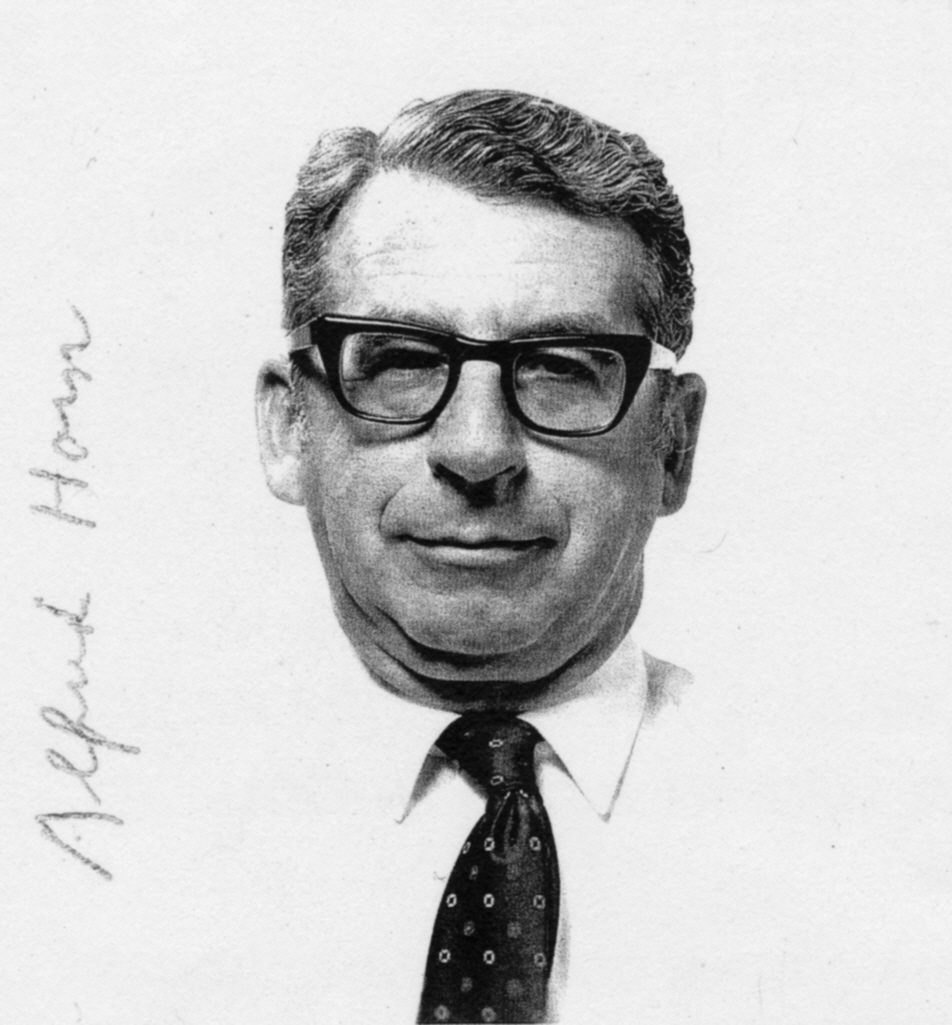
- Horn c. 1973
- Born: February 17, 1918; Lower East Side, Manhattan, U.S.
- Died: April 16, 2001 (aged 83); Pacific Palisades, Los Angeles, U.S.
- Known for: Horn clause

Academic background
- Education: City College of New York (BS), New York University (MS), University of California, Berkeley (PhD)
- Thesis: On sentences which are true of direct unions of algebras (1951; 74 years ago)

Academic work
- Discipline: Mathematician, Logician
- Main interests: Lattice theory, Universal algebra

Alfred Horn (February 17, 1918 – April 16, 2001) was an American mathematician notable for his work in lattice theory and universal algebra. His 1951 paper "On sentences which are true of direct unions of algebras" described Horn clauses and Horn sentences, which later became used in logic programming.

== Biography ==
Horn was born on Lower East Side, Manhattan. His parents were both deaf, and his father died when Horn was three years old. At this point, the children moved in with their grandparents on the mother's side. They would later move to Brooklyn where Horn spent most of his childhood, raised by his extended family.

Horn attended the City College of New York, and later, New York University where he earned a Master's degree in mathematics. He went on to earn his Doctor of Philosophy at University of California, Berkeley in 1946. A year later, he started work at the University of California, Los Angeles, where he stayed until his retirement in 1988. He died in 2001 in Pacific Palisades, Los Angeles.

== See also ==
- Donald A. Martin
