= Antihomomorphism =

Homomorphism reversing the order of something

In mathematics, an antihomomorphism is a type of function defined on sets with multiplication that reverses the order of multiplication. An antiautomorphism is an invertible antihomomorphism, i.e. an antiisomorphism, from a set to itself. From bijectivity it follows that antiautomorphisms have inverses, and that the inverse of an antiautomorphism is also an antiautomorphism.

== Definition ==
Informally, an antihomomorphism is a map that switches the order of multiplication. Formally, an antihomomorphism between structures $X$ and $Y$ is a homomorphism $\phi\colon X \to Y^{\text{op}}$, where $Y^{\text{op}}$ equals $Y$ as a set, but has its multiplication reversed to that defined on $Y$. Denoting the (generally non-commutative) multiplication on $Y$ by $\cdot$, the multiplication on $Y^{\text{op}}$, denoted by $*$, is defined by $x*y := y \cdot x$. The object $Y^{\text{op}}$ is called the opposite object to $Y$ (respectively, opposite group, opposite algebra, opposite category etc.).

This definition is equivalent to that of a homomorphism $\phi\colon X^{\text{op}} \to Y$ (reversing the operation before or after applying the map is equivalent). Formally, sending $X$ to $X^{\text{op}}$ and acting as the identity on maps is a functor (indeed, an involution).

== Examples ==
In group theory, an antihomomorphism is a map between two groups that reverses the order of multiplication. So if φ : X → Y is a group antihomomorphism,

φ(xy) = φ(y)φ(x)

for all x, y in X.

The map that sends x to x^{−1} is an example of a group antiautomorphism. Another important example is the transpose operation in linear algebra, which takes row vectors to column vectors. Any vector-matrix equation may be transposed to an equivalent equation where the order of the factors is reversed.

With matrices, an example of an antiautomorphism is given by the transpose map. Since inversion and transposing both give antiautomorphisms, their composition is an automorphism. This involution is often called the contragredient map, and it provides an example of an outer automorphism of the general linear group GL(n, F), where F is a field, except when |F| = 2 and n = 1 or 2, or |F| = 3 and n = 1 (i.e., for the groups GL(1, 2), GL(2, 2), and GL(1, 3)).

In ring theory, an antihomomorphism is a map between two rings that preserves addition, but reverses the order of multiplication. So φ : X → Y is a ring antihomomorphism if and only if:

φ(1) = 1
φ(x + y) = φ(x) + φ(y)
φ(xy) = φ(y)φ(x)

for all x, y in X.

For algebras over a field K, φ must be a K-linear map of the underlying vector space. If the underlying field has an involution, one can instead ask φ to be conjugate-linear, as in conjugate transpose, below.

=== Involutions ===
It is frequently the case that antiautomorphisms are involutions, i.e. the square of the antiautomorphism is the identity map; these are also called involutive antiautomorphisms. For example, in any group the map that sends x to its inverse x^{−1} is an involutive antiautomorphism.

A ring with an involutive antiautomorphism is called a *-ring, and these form an important class of examples.

== Properties ==
If the source X or the target Y is commutative, then an antihomomorphism is the same thing as a homomorphism.

The composition of two antihomomorphisms is always a homomorphism, since reversing the order twice preserves order. The composition of an antihomomorphism with a homomorphism gives another antihomomorphism.

== See also ==
- Semigroup with involution
