= Semigroup with two elements =

Example of a Semigroup

In mathematics, a semigroup with two elements is a semigroup for which the cardinality of the underlying set is two. There are exactly five nonisomorphic semigroups having two elements:

- O_{2}, the null semigroup of order two.
- LO_{2}, the left zero semigroup of order two.
- RO_{2}, the right zero semigroup of order two.
- ({0,1}, ∧) (where "∧" is the logical connective "and"), or equivalently the set {0,1} under multiplication: the only semilattice with two elements and the only non-null semigroup with zero of order two, also a monoid, and ultimately the two-element Boolean algebra; this is also isomorphic to (Z_{2}, ·_{2}), the multiplicative group of {0,1} modulo 2.
- (Z_{2}, +_{2}) (where Z_{2} = {0,1} and "+_{2}" is "addition modulo 2"), or equivalently ({0,1}, ⊕) (where "⊕" is the logical connective "xor"), or equivalently the set {−1,1} under multiplication: the only group of order two.

The semigroups LO_{2} and RO_{2} are antiisomorphic. O_{2}, ({0,1}, ∧) and (Z_{2}, +_{2}) are commutative, and LO_{2} and RO_{2} are noncommutative. LO_{2}, RO_{2} and ({0,1}, ∧) are bands.

== Determination of semigroups with two elements ==
Choosing the set A = { 1, 2 } as the underlying set having two elements, sixteen binary operations can be defined in A. These operations are shown in the table below. In the table, a matrix of the form

x	y
z	t

indicates a binary operation on A having the following Cayley table.

	1	2
1	x	y
2	z	t

List of binary operations in { 1, 2 }
1 / 1; 1 / 1	1 / 1; 1 / 2	1 / 1; 2 / 1	1 / 1; 2 / 2
Null semigroup O_{2}	≡ Semigroup ({0,1}, $\wedge$)	2·(1·2) = 2, (2·1)·2 = 1	Left zero semigroup LO_{2}
1 / 2; 1 / 1	1 / 2; 1 / 2	1 / 2; 2 / 1	1 / 2; 2 / 2
2·(1·2) = 1, (2·1)·2 = 2	Right zero semigroup RO_{2}	≡ Group (Z_{2}, ·_{2})	≡ Semigroup ({0,1}, $\wedge$)
2 / 1; 1 / 1	2 / 1; 1 / 2	2 / 1; 2 / 1	2 / 1; 2 / 2
1·(1·2) = 2, (1·1)·2 = 1	≡ Group (Z_{2}, +_{2})	1·(1·1) = 1, (1·1)·1 = 2	1·(2·1) = 1, (1·2)·1 = 2
2 / 2; 1 / 1	2 / 2; 1 / 2	2 / 2; 2 / 1	2 / 2; 2 / 2
1·(1·1) = 2, (1·1)·1 = 1	1·(2·1) = 2, (1·2)·1 = 1	1·(1·2) = 2, (1·1)·2 = 1	Null semigroup O_{2}

In this table:

- The semigroup ({0,1}, $\wedge$) denotes the two-element semigroup containing the zero element 0 and the unit element 1. The two binary operations defined by matrices in a green background are associative and pairing either with A creates a semigroup isomorphic to the semigroup ({0,1}, $\wedge$). Every element is idempotent in this semigroup, so it is a band. Furthermore, it is commutative (abelian) and thus a semilattice. The order induced is a linear order, and so it is in fact a lattice and it is also a distributive and complemented lattice, i.e. it is actually the two-element Boolean algebra.
- The two binary operations defined by matrices in a blue background are associative and pairing either with A creates a semigroup isomorphic to the null semigroup O_{2} with two elements.
- The binary operation defined by the matrix in an orange background is associative and pairing it with A creates a semigroup. This is the left zero semigroup LO_{2}. It is not commutative.
- The binary operation defined by the matrix in a purple background is associative and pairing it with A creates a semigroup. This is the right zero semigroup RO_{2}. It is also not commutative.
- The two binary operations defined by matrices in a red background are associative and pairing either with A creates a semigroup isomorphic to the group (Z_{2}, +_{2}).
- The remaining eight binary operations defined by matrices in a white background are not associative and hence none of them create a semigroup when paired with A.

== The two-element semigroup ({0,1}, ∧) ==
The Cayley table for the semigroup ({0,1}, $\wedge$) is given below:

$\wedge$	0	1
0	0	0
1	0	1

This is the simplest non-trivial example of a semigroup that is not a group. This semigroup has an identity element, 1, making it a monoid. It is also commutative. It is not a group because the element 0 does not have an inverse, and is not even a cancellative semigroup because we cannot cancel the 0 in the equation 1·0 = 0·0.

This semigroup arises in various contexts. For instance, if we choose 1 to be the truth value "true" and 0 to be the truth value "false" and the operation to be the logical connective "and", we obtain this semigroup in logic. It is isomorphic to the monoid {0,1} under multiplication. It is also isomorphic to the semigroup
$$S = \left\{
\begin{pmatrix}
1 & 0 \\
0 & 1
\end{pmatrix},
\begin{pmatrix}
1 & 0 \\
0 & 0
\end{pmatrix}
\right\}$$
under matrix multiplication.

== The two-element semigroup (Z_{2}, +_{2}) ==
The Cayley table for the semigroup (Z_{2}, +_{2}) is given below:

+_{2}	0	1
0	0	1
1	1	0

This group is isomorphic to the cyclic group Z_{2} and the symmetric group S_{2}.

== Semigroups of order 3 ==
Let A be the three-element set {1, 2, 3}. Altogether, a total of 3^{9} = 19683 different binary operations can be defined on A. 113 of the 19683 binary operations determine 24 nonisomorphic semigroups, or 18 non-equivalent semigroups (with equivalence being isomorphism or anti-isomorphism). With the exception of the group with three elements, each of these has one (or more) of the above two-element semigroups as subsemigroups. For example, the set {−1, 0, 1} under multiplication is a semigroup of order 3, and contains both {0, 1} and {−1, 1} as subsemigroups.

== Finite semigroups of higher orders ==
Algorithms and computer programs have been developed for determining nonisomorphic finite semigroups of a given order. These have been applied to determine the nonisomorphic semigroups of small order. The number of nonisomorphic semigroups with n elements, for n a nonnegative integer, is listed under OEIS: A027851 in the On-Line Encyclopedia of Integer Sequences. OEIS: A001423 lists the number of non-equivalent semigroups, and OEIS: A023814 the number of associative binary operations, out of a total of n^{n^{2}}, determining a semigroup.

== See also ==
- Empty semigroup
- Trivial semigroup (semigroup with one element)
- Semigroup with three elements
- Special classes of semigroups
