= Zero object (algebra) =

Algebraic structure with only one element

Morphisms to and from the zero object

In algebra, the zero object of a given algebraic structure is, in the sense explained below, the simplest object of such structure. As a set it is a singleton, and as a magma has a trivial structure, which is also an abelian group. The aforementioned abelian group structure is usually identified as addition, and the only element is called zero, so the object itself is typically denoted as {0}. One often refers to the trivial object (of a specified category) since every trivial object is isomorphic to any other (under a unique isomorphism).

Instances of the zero object include, but are not limited to the following:

- As a group, the zero group or trivial group.
- As a ring, the zero ring or trivial ring.
- As an algebra over a field or algebra over a ring, the trivial algebra.
- As a module (over a ring R), the zero module. The term trivial module is also used, although it may be ambiguous, as a trivial G-module is a G-module with a trivial action.
- As a vector space (over a field R), the zero vector space, zero-dimensional vector space or just zero space.

These objects are described jointly not only based on the common singleton and trivial group structure, but also because of shared category-theoretical properties.

In the last three cases the scalar multiplication by an element of the base ring (or field) is defined as:

κ0 = 0 , where κ ∈ R.

The most general of them, the zero module, is a finitely-generated module with an empty generating set.

For structures requiring the multiplication structure inside the zero object, such as the trivial ring, there is only one possible, 0 × 0 = 0, because there are no non-zero elements. This structure is associative and commutative. A ring R which has both an additive and multiplicative identity is trivial if and only if 1 = 0, since this equality implies that for all r within R,

$$r = r \times 1 = r \times 0 = 0 .$$

In this case it is possible to define division by zero, since the single element is its own multiplicative inverse. Some properties of {0} depend on exact definition of the multiplicative identity; see § Unital structures below.

Any trivial algebra is also a trivial ring. A trivial algebra over a field is simultaneously a zero vector space considered below. Over a commutative ring, a trivial algebra is simultaneously a zero module.

The trivial ring is an example of a rng of square zero. A trivial algebra is an example of a zero algebra.

The zero-dimensional vector space is an especially ubiquitous example of a zero object, a vector space over a field with an empty basis. It therefore has dimension zero. It is also a trivial group over addition, and a trivial module mentioned above.

== Properties ==
2↕	$$\begin{bmatrix}0 \\ 0\end{bmatrix}$$	=	$$\begin{bmatrix} \,\\ \,\end{bmatrix}$$	[ ]	‹0
	↔ 1		^ 0	↔ 1
Element of the zero space, written as empty column vector (rightmost one), is multiplied by 2×0 empty matrix to obtain 2-dimensional zero vector (leftmost). Rules of matrix multiplication are respected.

The zero ring, zero module and zero vector space are the zero objects of, respectively, the category of pseudo-rings, the category of modules and the category of vector spaces. However, the zero ring is not a zero object in the category of rings, since there is no ring homomorphism of the zero ring in any other ring.

The zero object, by definition, must be a terminal object, which means that a morphism A → {0} must exist and be unique for an arbitrary object A. This morphism maps any element of A to 0.

The zero object, also by definition, must be an initial object, which means that a morphism {0} → A must exist and be unique for an arbitrary object A. This morphism maps 0, the only element of {0}, to the zero element 0 ∈ A, called the zero vector in vector spaces. This map is a monomorphism, and hence its image is isomorphic to {0}. For modules and vector spaces, this subset {0} ⊂ A is the only empty-generated submodule (or 0-dimensional linear subspace) in each module (or vector space) A.

=== Unital structures ===
The {0} object is a terminal object of any algebraic structure where it exists, like it was described for examples above. But its existence and, if it exists, the property to be an initial object (and hence, a zero object in the category-theoretical sense) depend on exact definition of the multiplicative identity 1 in a specified structure.

If the definition of 1 requires that 1 ≠ 0, then the {0} object cannot exist because it may contain only one element. In particular, the zero ring is not a field. If mathematicians sometimes talk about a field with one element, this abstract and somewhat mysterious mathematical object is not a field.

In categories where the multiplicative identity must be preserved by morphisms, but can equal to zero, the {0} object can exist. But not as initial object because identity-preserving morphisms from {0} to any object where 1 ≠ 0 do not exist. For example, in the category of rings Ring the ring of integers Z is the initial object, not {0}.

If an algebraic structure requires the multiplicative identity, but neither its preservation by morphisms nor 1 ≠ 0, then zero morphisms exist and the situation is not different from non-unital structures considered in the previous section.

== Notation ==
Zero vector spaces and zero modules are usually denoted by 0 (instead of {0}). This is always the case when they occur in an exact sequence.

== See also ==
- Nildimensional space
- Triviality (mathematics)
- Examples of vector spaces
- Field with one element
- Empty semigroup
- Zero element
- List of zero terms
