= Trivial semigroup =

Semigroup containing exactly one element

In mathematics, a trivial semigroup (a semigroup with one element) is a semigroup for which the cardinality of the underlying set is one. The number of distinct nonisomorphic semigroups with one element is one. If S = { a } is a semigroup with one element, then the Cayley table of S is

	a
a	a

The only element in S is the zero element 0 of S and is also the identity element 1 of S. However not all semigroup theorists consider the unique element in a semigroup with one element as the zero element of the semigroup. They define zero elements only in semigroups having at least two elements.

In spite of its extreme triviality, the semigroup with one element is important in many situations. It is the starting point for understanding the structure of semigroups. It serves as a counterexample in illuminating many situations. For example, the semigroup with one element is the only semigroup in which 0 = 1, that is, the zero element and the identity element are equal. Further, if S is a semigroup with one element, the semigroup obtained by adjoining an identity element to S is isomorphic to the semigroup obtained by adjoining a zero element to S.

The semigroup with one element is also a group.

In the language of category theory, any semigroup with one element is a terminal object in the category of semigroups.

== See also ==
- Trivial group
- Zero ring
- Field with one element
- Empty semigroup
- Semigroup with two elements
- Semigroup with three elements
- Special classes of semigroups
