= Opposite group =

This is a natural transformation of binary operation from a group to its opposite. ⟨g_{1}, g_{2}⟩ denotes the ordered pair of the two group elements. *' can be viewed as the naturally induced addition of +.

In group theory, a branch of mathematics, an opposite group is a way to construct a group from another group that allows one to define right action as a special case of left action.

Monoids, groups, rings, and algebras can be viewed as categories with a single object. The construction of the opposite category generalizes the opposite group, opposite ring, etc.

== Definition ==
Let $G$ be a group under the operation $*$. The opposite group of $G$, denoted $G^{\mathrm{op}}$, has the same underlying set as $G$, and its group operation $\mathbin{\ast'}$ is defined by $g_1 \mathbin{\ast'} g_2 = g_2 * g_1$.

If $G$ is abelian, then it is equal to its opposite group. Also, every group $G$ (not necessarily abelian) is naturally isomorphic to its opposite group: An isomorphism $\varphi: G \to G^{\mathrm{op}}$ is given by $\varphi(x) = x^{-1}$. More generally, any antiautomorphism $\psi: G \to G$ gives rise to a corresponding isomorphism $\psi': G \to G^{\mathrm{op}}$ via $\psi'(g)=\psi(g)$, since

$$\psi'(g * h) = \psi(g * h) = \psi(h) * \psi(g) = \psi(g) \mathbin{\ast'} \psi(h)=\psi'(g) \mathbin{\ast'} \psi'(h).$$

== Group action ==
Let $X$ be an object in some category, and $\rho: G \to \mathrm{Aut}(X)$ be a right action. Then $\rho^{\mathrm{op}}: G^{\mathrm{op}} \to \mathrm{Aut}(X)$ is a left action defined by $\rho^{\mathrm{op}}(g)x = x\rho(g)$, or $g^{\mathrm{op}}x = xg$.

== See also ==
- Opposite ring
- Opposite category
