= Empty semigroup =

Semigroup containing no elements

In mathematics, a semigroup with no elements (the empty semigroup) is a semigroup in which the underlying set is the empty set. Many authors do not admit the existence of such a semigroup. For them a semigroup is by definition a non-empty set together with an associative binary operation. However not all authors insist on the underlying set of a semigroup being non-empty. One can logically define a semigroup in which the underlying set S is empty. The binary operation in the semigroup is the empty function from S × S to S. This operation vacuously satisfies the closure and associativity axioms of a semigroup. Not excluding the empty semigroup simplifies certain results on semigroups. For example, the result that the intersection of two subsemigroups of a semigroup T is a subsemigroup of T becomes valid even when the intersection is empty.

When a semigroup is defined to have additional structure, the issue may not arise. For example, the definition of a monoid requires an identity element, which rules out the empty semigroup as a monoid.

In category theory, the empty semigroup is always admitted. It is the unique initial object of the category of semigroups.

A semigroup with no elements is an inverse semigroup, since the necessary condition is vacuously satisfied.

== See also ==
- Field with one element
- Semigroup with one element
- Semigroup with two elements
- Semigroup with three elements
- Special classes of semigroups
