= Medial magma =

Algebraic structure

In abstract algebra, a medial magma or medial groupoid is a magma or groupoid (that is, a set with a binary operation) that satisfies the identity

(x • y) • (u • v) = (x • u) • (y • v),

or more simply,

xy • uv = xu • yv

for all x, y, u and v, using the convention that juxtaposition denotes the same operation but has higher precedence. This identity has been variously called medial, abelian, alternation, transposition, interchange, bi-commutative, bisymmetric, surcommutative, entropic, etc.

Any commutative semigroup is a medial magma, and a medial magma has an identity element if and only if it is a commutative monoid. The "only if" direction is the Eckmann–Hilton argument. Another class of semigroups forming medial magmas are normal bands. Medial magmas need not be associative: for any nontrivial abelian group with operation + and integers m ≠ n, the new binary operation defined by x • y = mx + ny yields a medial magma that in general is neither associative nor commutative.

Using the categorical definition of product, for a magma M, one may define the Cartesian square magma M × M with the operation

(x, y) • (u, v) = (x • u, y • v).

The binary operation • of M, considered as a mapping from M × M to M, maps (x, y) to x • y, (u, v) to u • v, and (x • u, y • v) to (x • u) • (y • v) . Hence, a magma M is medial if and only if its binary operation is a magma homomorphism from M × M to M. This can easily be expressed in terms of a commutative diagram, and thus leads to the notion of a medial magma object in a category with a Cartesian product. (See the discussion in auto magma object.)

If f and g are endomorphisms of a medial magma, then the mapping f • g defined by pointwise multiplication

(f • g)(x) = f(x) • g(x)

is itself an endomorphism. It follows that the set End(M) of all endomorphisms of a medial magma M is itself a medial magma.

== Bruck–Murdoch–Toyoda theorem ==
The Bruck–Murdoch–Toyoda theorem provides the following characterization of medial quasigroups. Given an abelian group A and two commuting automorphisms φ and ψ of A, define an operation • on A by

x • y = φ(x) + ψ(y) + c,

where c some fixed element of A. It is not hard to prove that A forms a medial quasigroup under this operation. The Bruck–Murdoch-Toyoda theorem states that every medial quasigroup is of this form, i.e. is isomorphic to a quasigroup defined from an abelian group in this way. In particular, every medial quasigroup is isotopic to an abelian group.

The result was obtained independently in 1941 by Murdoch and Toyoda. It was then rediscovered by Bruck in 1944.

== Generalizations ==
The term medial or (more commonly) entropic is also used for a generalization to multiple operations. An algebraic structure is an entropic algebra if every two operations satisfy a generalization of the medial identity. Let f and g be operations of arity m and n, respectively. Then f and g are required to satisfy

$$f(g(x_{11}, \ldots, x_{1n}), \ldots, g(x_{m1}, \ldots, x_{mn})) = g(f(x_{11}, \ldots, x_{m1}), \ldots, f(x_{1n}, \ldots, x_{mn})).$$

== Nonassociative examples ==
A particularly natural example of a nonassociative medial magma is given by collinear points on elliptic curves. The operation x • y = −(x + y) for points on the curve, corresponding to drawing a line between x and y and defining x • y as the third intersection point of the line with the elliptic curve, is a (commutative) medial magma which is isotopic to the operation of elliptic curve addition.

Unlike elliptic curve addition, x • y is independent of the choice of a neutral element on the curve, and further satisfies the identities x • (x • y) = y. This property is commonly used in purely geometric proofs that elliptic curve addition is associative.
