= Nowhere commutative semigroup =

Algebraic structure in semigroup theory

In mathematics, a nowhere commutative semigroup is a semigroup S such that, for all a and b in S, if ab = ba then a = b. A semigroup S is nowhere commutative if and only if any two elements of S are inverses of each other.

== Characterization of nowhere commutative semigroups ==
Nowhere commutative semigroups can be characterized in several different ways. If S is a semigroup then the following statements are equivalent:

- S is nowhere commutative.
- S is a rectangular band (in the sense in which the term is used by John Howie).
- For all a and b in S, aba = a.
- For all a, b and c in S, a^{2} = a and abc = ac.

Even though, by definition, the rectangular bands are concrete semigroups, they have the defect that their definition is formulated not in terms of the basic binary operation in the semigroup. The approach via the definition of nowhere commutative semigroups rectifies this defect.

To see that a nowhere commutative semigroup is a rectangular band, let S be a nowhere commutative semigroup. Using the defining properties of a nowhere commutative semigroup, one can see that for every a in S the intersection of the Green classes R_{a} and L_{a} contains the unique element a. Let S / L be the family of L-classes in S and S / R be the family of R-classes in S. The mapping

ψ : S → (S / R) × (S / L)

defined by

aψ = (R_{a} , L_{a})

is a bijection. If the Cartesian product (S / R) × (S / L) is made into a semigroup by furnishing it with the rectangular band multiplication, the map ψ becomes an isomorphism. So S is isomorphic to a rectangular band.

Other claims of equivalences follow directly from the relevant definitions.

== See also ==
- Special classes of semigroups
