= Quasigroup =

Magma obeying the Latin square property

Algebraic structures between magmas and groups: A quasigroup is a magma with the type of divisibility given by the Latin square property. A loop is a quasigroup with an identity element.

In mathematics, especially in abstract algebra, a quasigroup is an algebraic structure that resembles a group in the sense that "division" is always possible. Quasigroups differ from groups mainly in that the associative and identity element properties are optional. In fact, a nonempty associative quasigroup is a group.

A quasigroup that has an identity element is called a loop.

== Definitions ==
There are at least two structurally equivalent formal definitions of a quasigroup:

- One defines a quasigroup as a set with one binary operation.
- The other, from universal algebra, defines a quasigroup as having three primitive operations.

The homomorphic image of a quasigroup that is defined with a single binary operation, however, need not be a quasigroup, in contrast to a quasigroup as having three primitive operations. We begin with the first definition.

=== Algebra ===
A quasigroup (Q, ∗) is a set Q with a binary operation ∗ (that is, a magma, indicating that a quasigroup has to satisfy the closure property), obeying the Latin square property. This states that, for each a and b in Q, there exist unique elements x and y in Q such that both
$$a \ast x = b$$
$$y \ast a = b$$
hold. (In other words: Each element of the set occurs exactly once in each row and exactly once in each column of the quasigroup's multiplication table, or Cayley table. This property ensures that the Cayley table of a finite quasigroup, and, in particular, a finite group, is a Latin square.) The requirement that x and y be unique can be replaced by the requirement that the magma be cancellative. (Note: For clarity, cancellativity alone is insufficient: the requirement for existence of a solution must be retained.)

The unique solutions to these equations are written x = a \ b and y = b / a. The operations '\' and '/' are called, respectively, left division and right division. With regard to the Cayley table, the first equation (left division) means that the b entry in the a row is in the x column while the second equation (right division) means that the b entry in the a column is in the y row.

The empty set equipped with the empty binary operation satisfies this definition of a quasigroup. Some authors accept the empty quasigroup, but others explicitly exclude it.

=== Universal algebra ===
Given some algebraic structure, an identity is an equation in which all variables are tacitly universally quantified, and in which all operations are among the primitive operations proper to the structure. Algebraic structures that satisfy axioms that are given solely by identities are called varieties. Many standard results in universal algebra hold only for varieties. Quasigroups form a variety if left and right division are taken as primitive.

A right-quasigroup (Q, ∗, /) is a type (2, 2) algebra that satisfies the identities:
$$y = (y / x) \ast x$$
$$y = (y \ast x) / x$$

A left-quasigroup (Q, ∗, \) is a type (2, 2) algebra that satisfies the identities:
$$y = x \ast (x \backslash y)$$
$$y = x \backslash (x \ast y)$$

A quasigroup (Q, ∗, \, /) is a type (2, 2, 2) algebra (i.e., equipped with three binary operations) that satisfies the identities: (Note: There are six identities that these operations satisfy, namely: $$y = (y / x) \ast x$$ $$y = x \backslash (x \ast y)$$ $$y = x / (y \backslash x)$$ $$y = (y \ast x) / x$$ $$y = x \ast (x \backslash y)$$ $$y = (x / y) \backslash x$$ Of these, the first three imply the last three, and vice versa, leading to either set of three identities being sufficient to equationally specify a quasigroup.)
$$y = (y / x) \ast x$$
$$y = (y \ast x) / x$$
$$y = x \ast (x \backslash y)$$
$$y = x \backslash (x \ast y)$$

In other words: Multiplication and division in either order, one after the other, on the same side by the same element, have no net effect.

Hence if (Q, ∗) is a quasigroup according to the definition of the previous section, then (Q, ∗, \, /) is the same quasigroup in the sense of universal algebra. And vice versa: if (Q, ∗, \, /) is a quasigroup according to the sense of universal algebra, then (Q, ∗) is a quasigroup according to the first definition.

== Loops ==
A loop is a quasigroup with an identity element; that is, an element, e, such that

x ∗ e = x and e ∗ x = x for all x in Q.

It follows that the identity element, e, is unique, and that every element of Q has unique left and right inverses (which need not be the same). Since the presence of an identity element is essential, a loop cannot be empty.

A quasigroup with an idempotent element is called a pique ("pointed idempotent quasigroup"); this is a weaker notion than a loop but common nonetheless because, for example, given an abelian group, (A, +), taking its subtraction operation as quasigroup multiplication yields a pique (A, −) with the group identity (zero) turned into a "pointed idempotent". (That is, there is a principal isotopy (x, y, z) ↦ (x, −y, z).)

A loop that is associative is a group. A group can have a strictly nonassociative pique isotope, but it cannot have a strictly nonassociative loop isotope.

There are weaker associativity properties that have been given special names.

For instance, a Bol loop is a loop that satisfies either:

x ∗ (y ∗ (x ∗ z)) = (x ∗ (y ∗ x)) ∗ z for each x, y and z in Q (a left Bol loop),

or else

((z ∗ x) ∗ y) ∗ x = z ∗ ((x ∗ y) ∗ x) for each x, y and z in Q (a right Bol loop).

A loop that is both a left and right Bol loop is a Moufang loop. This is equivalent to any one of the following single Moufang identities holding for all x, y, z:

x ∗ (y ∗ (x ∗ z)) = ((x ∗ y) ∗ x) ∗ z
z ∗ (x ∗ (y ∗ x)) = ((z ∗ x) ∗ y) ∗ x
(x ∗ y) ∗ (z ∗ x) = x ∗ ((y ∗ z) ∗ x)
(x ∗ y) ∗ (z ∗ x) = (x ∗ (y ∗ z)) ∗ x.

According to Jonathan D. H. Smith, "loops" were named after the Chicago Loop, as their originators were studying quasigroups in Chicago at the time.

== Symmetries ==
Smith (2007) names the following important properties and subclasses:

=== Semisymmetry ===
A quasigroup is semisymmetric if any of the following equivalent identities hold for all x, y: (Note: The first two equations are equivalent to the last two by direct application of the cancellation property of quasigroups. The last pair are shown to be equivalent by setting x = ((x ∗ y) ∗ x) ∗ (x ∗ y) = y ∗ (x ∗ y).)

x ∗ y = y / x
y ∗ x = x \ y
x = (y ∗ x) ∗ y
x = y ∗ (x ∗ y).

Although this class may seem special, every quasigroup Q induces a semisymmetric quasigroup QΔ on the direct product cube Q^{3} via the following operation:

(x_{1}, x_{2}, x_{3}) ⋅ (y_{1}, y_{2}, y_{3}) = (y_{3} / x_{2}, y_{1} \ x_{3}, x_{1} ∗ y_{2}) = (x_{2} // y_{3}, x_{3} \\ y_{1}, x_{1} ∗ y_{2}),

where "//" and "\\" are the conjugate division operations given by y // x = x / y and y \\ x = x \ y.

=== Triality ===
A quasigroup may exhibit semisymmetric triality.

=== Total symmetry ===
A narrower class is a totally symmetric quasigroup (sometimes abbreviated TS-quasigroup) in which all conjugates coincide as one operation: x ∗ y = x / y = x \ y. Another way to define (the same notion of) totally symmetric quasigroup is as a semisymmetric quasigroup that is commutative, i.e. x ∗ y = y ∗ x.

Idempotent total symmetric quasigroups are precisely (i.e. in a bijection with) Steiner triples, so such a quasigroup is also called a Steiner quasigroup, and sometimes the latter is even abbreviated as squag. The term sloop refers to an analogue for loops, namely, totally symmetric loops that satisfy x ∗ x = 1 instead of x ∗ x = x. Without idempotency, total symmetric quasigroups correspond to the geometric notion of extended Steiner triple, also called Generalized Elliptic Cubic Curve (GECC).

=== Total antisymmetry ===
A quasigroup (Q, ∗) is called weakly totally anti-symmetric if for all c, x, y ∈ Q, the following implication holds.

(c ∗ x) ∗ y = (c ∗ y) ∗ x implies that x = y.

A quasigroup (Q, ∗) is called totally anti-symmetric if, in addition, for all x, y ∈ Q, the following implication holds:

x ∗ y = y ∗ x implies that x = y.

This property is required, for example, in the Damm algorithm.

== Examples ==
- Every group is a loop, because a ∗ x = b if and only if x = a^{−1} ∗ b, and y ∗ a = b if and only if y = b ∗ a^{−1}.
- The integers Z (or the rationals Q or the reals R) with subtraction (−) form a quasigroup. These quasigroups are not loops because there is no identity element (0 is a right identity because a − 0 = a, but not a left identity because, in general, 0 − a ≠ a).
- The nonzero rationals Q^{×} (or the nonzero reals R^{×}) with division (÷) form a quasigroup.
- Any vector space over a field of characteristic not equal to 2 forms an idempotent, commutative quasigroup under the operation x ∗ y = (x + y) / 2.
- Every Steiner triple system defines an idempotent, commutative quasigroup: a ∗ b is the third element of the triple containing a and b. These quasigroups also satisfy (x ∗ y) ∗ y = x for all x and y in the quasigroup. These quasigroups are known as Steiner quasigroups.
- The set {±1, ±i, ±j, ±k} where ii = jj = kk = +1 and with all other products as in the quaternion group forms a nonassociative loop of order 8. See hyperbolic quaternions for its application. (The hyperbolic quaternions themselves do not form a loop or quasigroup.)
- The nonzero octonions form a nonassociative loop under multiplication. The octonions are a special type of loop known as a Moufang loop.
- An associative quasigroup is either empty or is a group, since if there is at least one element, the invertibility of the quasigroup binary operation combined with associativity implies the existence of an identity element, which then implies the existence of inverse elements, thus satisfying all three requirements of a group.
- The following construction is due to Hans Zassenhaus. On the underlying set of the four-dimensional vector space F^{4} over the 3-element Galois field F = Z/3Z define
  (x_{1}, x_{2}, x_{3}, x_{4}) ∗ (y_{1}, y_{2}, y_{3}, y_{4}) = (x_{1}, x_{2}, x_{3}, x_{4}) + (y_{1}, y_{2}, y_{3}, y_{4}) + (0, 0, 0, (x_{3} − y_{3})(x_{1}y_{2} − x_{2}y_{1})).

Then, (F^{4}, ∗) is a commutative Moufang loop that is not a group.

- More generally, the nonzero elements of any division algebra form a quasigroup with the operation of multiplication in the algebra.

== Properties ==
In the remainder of the article we shall denote quasigroup multiplication simply by juxtaposition.

Quasigroups have the cancellation property: if ab = ac, then b = c. This follows from the uniqueness of left division of ab or ac by a. Similarly, if ba = ca, then b = c.

The Latin square property of quasigroups implies that, given any two of the three variables in xy = z, the third variable is uniquely determined.

=== Multiplication operators ===
The definition of a quasigroup can be treated as conditions on the left and right multiplication operators L_{x}, R_{x} : Q → Q, defined by

L_{x}(y) = xy
R_{x}(y) = yx

The definition says that both mappings are bijections from Q to itself. A magma Q is a quasigroup precisely when all these operators, for every x in Q, are bijective. The inverse mappings are left and right division, that is,

L^{−1}_{x}(y) = x \ y
R^{−1}_{x}(y) = y / x

In this notation the identities among the quasigroup's multiplication and division operations (stated in the section on universal algebra) are

L_{x}L^{−1}_{x} = id corresponding to x(x \ y) = y
L^{−1}_{x}L_{x} = id corresponding to x \ (xy) = y
R_{x}R^{−1}_{x} = id corresponding to (y / x)x = y
R^{−1}_{x}R_{x} = id corresponding to (yx) / x = y

where id denotes the identity mapping on Q.

=== Latin squares ===
A Latin square, the unbordered multiplication table for a quasigroup whose 10 elements are the digits 0–9.
0	4	8	2	3	9	6	7	1	5
3	6	2	8	7	1	9	5	0	4
8	9	3	1	0	6	4	2	5	7
1	7	6	5	4	8	0	3	2	9
2	1	9	0	6	7	5	8	4	3
5	2	7	4	9	3	1	0	8	6
4	3	0	6	1	5	2	9	7	8
9	8	5	7	2	0	3	4	6	1
7	0	1	9	5	4	8	6	3	2
6	5	4	3	8	2	7	1	9	0

The multiplication table of a finite quasigroup is a Latin square: an n × n table filled with n different symbols in such a way that each symbol occurs exactly once in each row and exactly once in each column.

Conversely, every Latin square can be taken as the multiplication table of a quasigroup in many ways: the border row (containing the column headers) and the border column (containing the row headers) can each be any permutation of the elements. See Small Latin squares and quasigroups.

==== Infinite quasigroups ====
For a countably infinite quasigroup Q, it is possible to imagine an infinite array in which every row and every column corresponds to some element q of Q, and where the element a ∗ b is in the row corresponding to a and the column responding to b. In this situation too, the Latin square property says that each row and each column of the infinite array will contain every possible value precisely once.

For an uncountably infinite quasigroup, such as the group of non-zero real numbers under multiplication, the Latin square property still holds, although the name is somewhat unsatisfactory, as it is not possible to produce the array of combinations to which the above idea of an infinite array extends since the real numbers cannot all be written in a sequence. (This is somewhat misleading however, as the reals can be written in a sequence of length $\mathfrak{c}$, assuming the well-ordering theorem.)

=== Inverse properties ===
The binary operation of a quasigroup is invertible in the sense that both L_{x} and R_{x}, the left and right multiplication operators, are bijective, and hence invertible.

Every loop element has a unique left and right inverse given by

x^{λ} = e / x x^{λ}x = e
x^{ρ} = x \ e xx^{ρ} = e

A loop is said to have (two-sided) inverses if x^{λ} = x^{ρ} for all x. In this case the inverse element is usually denoted by x^{−1}.

There are some stronger notions of inverses in loops that are often useful:

- A loop has the left inverse property if x^{λ}(xy) = y for all x and y. Equivalently, L^{−1}_{x} = L_{x^{λ}} or x \ y = x^{λ}y.
- A loop has the right inverse property if (yx)x^{ρ} = y for all x and y. Equivalently, R^{−1}_{x} = R_{x^{ρ}} or y / x = yx^{ρ}.
- A loop has the antiautomorphic inverse property if (xy)^{λ} = y^{λ}x^{λ} or, equivalently, if (xy)^{ρ} = y^{ρ}x^{ρ}.
- A loop has the weak inverse property when (xy)z = e if and only if x(yz) = e. This may be stated in terms of inverses via (xy)^{λ}x = y^{λ} or equivalently x(yx)^{ρ} = y^{ρ}.

A loop has the inverse property if it has both the left and right inverse properties. Inverse property loops also have the antiautomorphic and weak inverse properties. In fact, any loop that satisfies any two of the above four identities has the inverse property and therefore satisfies all four.

Any loop that satisfies the left, right, or antiautomorphic inverse properties automatically has two-sided inverses.

== Morphisms ==
A quasigroup or loop homomorphism is a map f : Q → P between two quasigroups such that f(xy) = f(x)f(y). Quasigroup homomorphisms necessarily preserve left and right division, as well as identity elements (if they exist).

=== Homotopy and isotopy ===
Let Q and P be quasigroups. A quasigroup homotopy from Q to P is a triple (α, β, γ) of maps from Q to P such that

α(x)β(y) = γ(xy)

for all x, y in Q. A quasigroup homomorphism is just a homotopy for which the three maps are equal.

An isotopy is a homotopy for which each of the three maps (α, β, γ) is a bijection. Two quasigroups are isotopic if there is an isotopy between them. In terms of Latin squares, an isotopy (α, β, γ) is given by a permutation of rows α, a permutation of columns β, and a permutation on the underlying element set γ.

An autotopy is an isotopy from a quasigroup to itself. The set of all autotopies of a quasigroup forms a group with the automorphism group as a subgroup.

Every quasigroup is isotopic to a loop. If a loop is isotopic to a group, then it is isomorphic to that group and thus is itself a group. However, a quasigroup that is isotopic to a group need not be a group. For example, the quasigroup on R with multiplication given by (x, y) ↦ (x + y)/2 is isotopic to the additive group (R, +), but is not itself a group as it has no identity element. Every medial quasigroup is isotopic to an abelian group by the Bruck–Toyoda theorem.

=== Conjugation (parastrophe) ===
Left and right division are examples of forming a quasigroup by permuting the variables in the defining equation. From the original operation ∗ (i.e., x ∗ y = z) we can form five new operations: x o y := y ∗ x (the opposite operation), / and \, and their opposites. That makes a total of six quasigroup operations, which are called the conjugates or parastrophes of ∗. Any two of these operations are said to be "conjugate" or "parastrophic" to each other (and to themselves).

=== Isostrophe (paratopy) ===
If the set Q has two quasigroup operations, ∗ and ·, and one of them is isotopic to a conjugate of the other, the operations are said to be isostrophic to each other. There are also many other names for this relation of "isostrophe", e.g., paratopy.

== Generalizations ==
=== Polyadic or multiary quasigroups ===
An n-ary quasigroup is a set with an n-ary operation, (Q, f) with f : Q^{n} → Q, such that the equation f(x_{1}, ..., x_{n}) = y has a unique solution for any one variable if all the other n variables are specified arbitrarily. Polyadic or multiary means n-ary for some nonnegative integer n.

A 0-ary, or nullary, quasigroup is just a constant element of Q. A 1-ary, or unary, quasigroup is a bijection of Q to itself. A binary, or 2-ary, quasigroup is an ordinary quasigroup.

An example of a multiary quasigroup is an iterated group operation, y = x_{1} · x_{2} · ··· · x_{n}; it is not necessary to use parentheses to specify the order of operations because the group is associative. One can also form a multiary quasigroup by carrying out any sequence of the same or different group or quasigroup operations, if the order of operations is specified.

There exist multiary quasigroups that cannot be represented in any of these ways. An n-ary quasigroup is irreducible if its operation cannot be factored into the composition of two operations in the following way:

f(x_{1}, ..., x_{n}) = g(x_{1}, ..., x_{i−1}, h(x_{i}, ..., x_{j}), x_{j+1}, ..., x_{n}),

where 1 ≤ i < j ≤ n and (i, j) ≠ (1, n). Finite irreducible n-ary quasigroups exist for all n > 2; see Akivis & Goldberg (2001) for details.

An n-ary quasigroup with an n-ary version of associativity is called an n-ary group.

== Number of small quasigroups and loops ==
The number of isomorphism classes of small quasigroups (sequence A057991 in the OEIS) and loops (sequence A057771 in the OEIS) is given here:

Order	Number of quasigroups	Number of loops
0	1	0
1	1	1
2	1	1
3	5	1
4	35	2
5	1411	6
6	1130531	109
7	12198455835	23746
8	2697818331680661	106228849
9	15224734061438247321497	9365022303540
10	2750892211809150446995735533513	20890436195945769617
11	19464657391668924966791023043937578299025	1478157455158044452849321016

== See also ==
- Division ring – a ring in which every non-zero element has a multiplicative inverse
- Semigroup – an algebraic structure consisting of a set together with an associative binary operation
- Monoid – a semigroup with an identity element
- Planar ternary ring – has an additive and multiplicative loop structure
- Problems in loop theory and quasigroup theory
- Pseudogroup – generalization of a transformation group
- Mathematics of Sudoku
