= Opposite ring =

Mathematical concept

In mathematics, specifically abstract algebra, the opposite of a ring is another ring with the same elements and addition operation, but with the multiplication performed in the reverse order. More explicitly, the opposite of a ring (R, +, ⋅) is the ring (R, +, ∗) whose multiplication ∗ is defined by a ∗ b = b ⋅ a for all a, b in R. The opposite ring can be used to define multimodules, a generalization of bimodules. They also help clarify the relationship between left and right modules (see § Properties).

Monoids, groups, rings, and algebras can all be viewed as categories with a single object. The construction of the opposite category generalizes the opposite group, opposite ring, etc.

== Relation to automorphisms and antiautomorphisms ==
In this section the symbol for multiplication in the opposite ring is changed from asterisk to diamond, to avoid confusing it with some unary operations.

A ring is called a self-opposite ring if it is isomorphic to its opposite ring, (Note: The self-opposite rings in "The Book of the Rings" are labeled "self-converse", which is a different name, but the meaning is clear.) which name indicates that $R^\text{op}$ is essentially the same as $R$.

All commutative rings are self-opposite.

Let us define the antiisomorphism

$\iota: (R,\diamond) \to (R,\cdot)$, where $\iota(a) = a$ for $a \in R$. (Note: Although ι is the identity function on the set R, it is not the identity as a morphism, since (R, ⋅) and (R, ⋄) are two different objects (if R is noncommutative) and the identity morphism can be only from an object to itself. Therefore, ι cannot be denoted as id_{R}, when R is understood as an abbreviation of (R, ⋄). If (R, ⋅) is commutative, then (R, ⋄) = (R, ⋅) and ι = id_{(R,⋅)} = id_{(R,⋄)} = id_{R}.)

It is indeed an antiisomorphism, since $\iota(a\diamond b) = a \diamond b = b\cdot a = \iota(b)\cdot\iota(a)$. The antiisomorphism $\iota$ can be defined generally for semigroups, monoids, groups, rings, rngs, algebras. In case of rings (and rngs) we obtain the general equivalence.

A ring (Note: In this equivalence (and in the next equality) the ring can be quite general i.e. with or without unity, noncommutative or commutative, finite or infinite.) is self-opposite if and only if it has at least one antiautomorphism.

Proof: $\Rightarrow$: Let $(R,\cdot)$ be self-opposite. If $f: (R,\cdot) \to (R,\diamond)$ is an isomorphism, then $\iota\circ f$, being a composition of antiisomorphism and isomorphism, is an antiisomorphism from $(R,\cdot)$ to itself, hence antiautomorphism.

$\Leftarrow$: If $g:(R,\cdot)\to(R,\cdot)$ is an antiautomorphism, then $(\iota^{-1}\circ g):(R,\cdot)\to(R,\diamond)$ is an isomorphism as a composition of two antiisomorphisms. So $(R,\cdot)$ is self-opposite.

and

If $(R,\cdot)$ is self-opposite and the group of automorphisms $\operatorname{Aut}(R,\cdot)$ is finite, then the number of antiautomorphisms equals the number of automorphisms.

Proof: By the assumption and the above equivalence there exist antiautomorphisms. If we pick one of them and denote it by $q$, then the map $h\mapsto q\circ h$, where $h$ runs over $\operatorname{Aut}(R,\cdot)$, is clearly injective but also surjective, since each antiautomorphism $g = q \circ(q^{{-1}}\circ g) = q\circ h$ for some automorphism $h$.

It can be proven in a similar way, that under the same assumptions the number of isomorphisms from $(R,\cdot)$ to $(R,\diamond)$ equals the number of antiautomorphisms of $(R,\cdot)$.

If some antiautomorphism $g$ is also an automorphism, then for each $a, b\in(R,\cdot)$

$$g(a \cdot b) = g(b) \cdot g(a) = g(b \cdot a)$$

Since $g$ is bijective, $a \cdot b = b \cdot a$ for all $a$ and $b$, so the ring is commutative and all antiautomorphisms are automorphisms. By contraposition, if a ring is noncommutative (and self-opposite), then no antiautomorphism is an automorphism.

Denote by $G$ the group of all automorphisms together with all antiautomorphisms. The above remarks imply, that $\vert G\vert = 2\vert\mathrm{Aut}(R,\cdot)\vert$ if a ring (or rng) is noncommutative and self-opposite. If it is commutative or non-self-opposite, then $\vert G\vert = \vert\mathrm{Aut}(R,\cdot)\vert$.

== Examples ==
=== The smallest noncommutative ring with unity ===
The smallest such ring $R$ has eight elements and it is the only noncommutative ring among 11 rings with unity of order 8, up to isomorphism. It has the additive group $\mathrm{C}_2\times \mathrm{C}_2\times \mathrm{C}_2 = \mathrm{C}_2^3$. Obviously $R^\text{op}$ is antiisomorphic to $R$, as is always the case, but it is also isomorphic to $R$. Below are the tables of addition and multiplication in $R$, (Note: The tables of operations differ from those in the source. They were modified in the following way. The unity 4 was renamed to 1 and 1 to 4 in the addition and multiplication table, and the rows and columns rearranged to position the unity 1 next to 0 for better clarity. Thus the two rings are isomorphic.) and multiplication in the opposite ring, which is a transposed table.

Addition
| + | 0 | 1 | 2 | 3 | 4 | 5 | 6 | 7 |
|---|---|---|---|---|---|---|---|---|
| 0 | 0 | 1 | 2 | 3 | 4 | 5 | 6 | 7 |
| 1 | 1 | 0 | 6 | 7 | 5 | 4 | 2 | 3 |
| 2 | 2 | 6 | 0 | 4 | 3 | 7 | 1 | 5 |
| 3 | 3 | 7 | 4 | 0 | 2 | 6 | 5 | 1 |
| 4 | 4 | 5 | 3 | 2 | 0 | 1 | 7 | 6 |
| 5 | 5 | 4 | 7 | 6 | 1 | 0 | 3 | 2 |
| 6 | 6 | 2 | 1 | 5 | 7 | 3 | 0 | 4 |
| 7 | 7 | 3 | 5 | 1 | 6 | 2 | 4 | 0 |

Multiplication
| $\cdot$ | 0 | 1 | 2 | 3 | 4 | 5 | 6 | 7 |
|---|---|---|---|---|---|---|---|---|
| 0 | 0 | 0 | 0 | 0 | 0 | 0 | 0 | 0 |
| 1 | 0 | 1 | 2 | 3 | 4 | 5 | 6 | 7 |
| 2 | 0 | 2 | 1 | 3 | 7 | 5 | 6 | 4 |
| 3 | 0 | 3 | 5 | 3 | 6 | 5 | 6 | 0 |
| 4 | 0 | 4 | 4 | 0 | 4 | 0 | 0 | 4 |
| 5 | 0 | 5 | 3 | 3 | 0 | 5 | 6 | 6 |
| 6 | 0 | 6 | 6 | 0 | 6 | 0 | 0 | 6 |
| 7 | 0 | 7 | 7 | 0 | 7 | 0 | 0 | 7 |

Opposite multiplication
| $\diamond$ | 0 | 1 | 2 | 3 | 4 | 5 | 6 | 7 |
|---|---|---|---|---|---|---|---|---|
| 0 | 0 | 0 | 0 | 0 | 0 | 0 | 0 | 0 |
| 1 | 0 | 1 | 2 | 3 | 4 | 5 | 6 | 7 |
| 2 | 0 | 2 | 1 | 5 | 4 | 3 | 6 | 7 |
| 3 | 0 | 3 | 3 | 3 | 0 | 3 | 0 | 0 |
| 4 | 0 | 4 | 7 | 6 | 4 | 0 | 6 | 7 |
| 5 | 0 | 5 | 5 | 5 | 0 | 5 | 0 | 0 |
| 6 | 0 | 6 | 6 | 6 | 0 | 6 | 0 | 0 |
| 7 | 0 | 7 | 4 | 0 | 4 | 6 | 6 | 7 |

To prove that the two rings are isomorphic, take a map $f: R^\text{op} \to R$ given by the table

Isomorphism between $R$ and $R^\text{op}$
| $x$ | 0 | 1 | 2 | 3 | 4 | 5 | 6 | 7 |
| $f(x)$ | 0 | 1 | 2 | 4 | 3 | 7 | 6 | 5 |

The map swaps elements in only two pairs: $3 \leftrightarrow 4$ and $5 \leftrightarrow 7$. Rename accordingly the elements in the multiplication table for $\diamond$ (arguments and values). Next, rearrange rows and columns to bring the arguments back to ascending order. The table becomes exactly the multiplication table of $R$. Similar changes in the table of additive group yield the same table, so $f$ is an automorphism of this group, and since $f(1)=1$, it is indeed a ring isomorphism.

The map is involutory, i.e. $f \circ f = \text{id}$, so $f^{-1}$=$f$ and it is an isomorphism from $R$ to $R^\text{op}$ equally well.

So, the permutation $f$ can be reinterpreted to define isomorphism $f:(R,\cdot)\rightarrow(R,\diamond)$ and then $q = \iota\circ f$ is an antiautomorphism of $(R,\cdot)$ given by the same permutation $q = (3,4)(5,7)$.

The ring $R$ has exactly two automorphisms: identity $\operatorname{id}_R$ and $p=(3,5)(4,7)$, that is $\operatorname{Aut}(R) = \{\operatorname{id}_R, p\}$. So its full group $G$ has four elements with two of them antiautomorphisms. One is $q$ and the second, denote it by $r$, can be calculated

$$r = q\circ p = (3,4)(5,7)(3,5)(4,7) = (3,7)(4,5)$$
$$G = \{\operatorname{id}_R,p,q,r\} = \{\operatorname{id}_R, (3,5)(4,7), (3,4)(5,7), (3,7)(4,5)\}$$

There is no element of order 4, so the group is not cyclic and must be the group $\mathrm{D}_2$ (the Klein group $\mathrm{K}_4$), which can be confirmed by calculation. The "symmetry group" of this ring is isomorphic to the symmetry group of rectangle.

=== Noncommutative ring with 27 elements ===
The ring of the upper triangular 2 × 2 matrices over the field with 3 elements $\text{F}_3$ has 27 elements and is a noncommutative ring. It is unique up to isomorphism, that is, all noncommutative rings with unity and 27 elements are isomorphic to it. The largest noncommutative ring $S$ listed in the "Book of the Rings" has 27 elements, and is also isomorphic. In this section the notation from "The Book" for the elements of $S$ is used. Two things should be kept in mind: that the element denoted by $18$ is the unity of $S$ and that $1$ is not the unity. The additive group of $S$ is $\mathrm{C}_3^3$.

The group of all automorphisms $\operatorname{Aut}(S)$ has 6 elements:

$$\begin{align}
h_1 &= \operatorname{id}_S\\
h_2 &= (1,13,25)(2,26,14)(4,16,19)(5,20,17)(7,10,22)(8,23,11)\\
h_3 &= (1,25,13)(2,14,26)(4,19,16)(5,17,20)(7,22,10)(8,11,23) = h_2^{-1} = h_2^2\\
h_4 &= (4,16)(5,17)(7,22)(8,23)(13,25)(14,26)(3,15)(6,21)(12,24)\\
h_5 &= (1,13)(2,26)(4,19)(8,11)(10,22)(17,20)(3,15)(6,21)(12,24)\\
h_6 &= (1,25)(2,14)(5,20)(7,10)(11,23)(16,19)(3,15)(6,21)(12,24).
\end{align}$$

Since $S$ is self-opposite, it has also 6 antiautomorphisms. One isomorphism $f:(S,\cdot)\to(S,\diamond)$ is $f = (1,14,13,2,25,26)(4,20,16,17,19,5)(7,8,10,23,22,11)(3,15)(6,21)(12,24)$, which can be verified using the tables of operations in "The Book" like in the first example by renaming and rearranging. This time the changes should be made in the original tables of operations of $S = (S,\cdot)$. The result is the multiplication table of $S^\operatorname{op} = (S,\diamond)$ and the addition table remains unchanged. Thus, one antiautomorphism

$$q_1 = \iota\circ f = (1,14,13,2,25,26)(4,20,16,17,19,5)(7,8,10,23,22,11)(3,15)(6,21)(12,24)$$

is given by the same permutation. The other five can be calculated (in the multiplicative notation the composition symbol $\circ$ can be dropped):

$$\begin{align}
q_2 &= q_1h_2 = (1,14,13,2,25,26)(4,20,16,17,19,5)(7,8,10,23,22,11)(3,15)(6,21)(12,24)\\
&\quad \cdot(1,13,25)(2,26,14)(4,16,19)(5,20,17)(7,10,22)(8,23,11)\\
&= [(1,14,13,2,25,26)(1,13,25)(2,26,14)] [(4,20,16,17,19,5)(4,16,19)(5,20,17)]\\
&\quad \cdot[(7,8,10,23,22,11)(7,10,22)(8,23,11)] (3,15)(6,21)(12,24)\\
&= (1,2)(13,26)(14,25)(4,17)(5,16)(19,20)(7,23)(8,22)(10,11)(3,15)(6,21)(12,24)\\
&= (1,2)(4,17)(5,16)(7,23)(8,22)(10,11)(13,26)(14,25)(19,20)(3,15)(6,21)(12,24)\\
q_3 &= q_1h_3 = (1,26,25,2,13,14)(4,5,19,17,16,20)(7,11,22,23,10,8)(3,15)(6,21)(12,24) = q_1^{-1}\\
q_4 &= q_1h_4 = (1,14)(2,25)(4,17)(5,19)(7,11)(8,22)(10,23)(13,26)(16,20)\\
q_5 &= q_1h_5 = (1,2)(4,5)(7,8)(10,11)(13,14)(16,17)(19,20)(22,23)(25,26)\\
q_6 &= q_1h_6 = (1,26)(2,13)(4,20)(5,16)(7,23)(8,10)(11,22)(14,25)(17,19)
\end{align}$$

$G = \{h_1,h_2,h_3,h_4,h_5,h_6,q_1,q_2,q_3,q_4,q_5,q_6\}.$

The group $G$ has 7 elements of order 2 (3 automorphisms and 4 antiautomorphisms) and can be identified as the dihedral group $\mathrm{D}_6$ (Note: Symbol D_{n} is meant to abbreviate Dih_{n}, the dihedral group with 2n elements, i.e. geometric convention is used.) (see List of small groups). In geometric analogy the ring $S$ has the "symmetry group" $G$ isomorphic to the symmetry group of 3-antiprism, (Note: The name 3-antiprism is here understood as the right 3-gonal antiprism that is not uniform, i.e. its side faces are not equilateral triangles. If they were equilateral, the antiprism would be the regular octahedron having the symmetry group larger than D_{3d}.) which is the point group $\mathrm{D}_\mathrm{3d}$ in Schoenflies notation or $\overline 3m$ in short Hermann–Mauguin notation for 3-dimensional space.

=== The smallest non-self-opposite rings with unity ===
All the rings with unity of orders ranging from 9 up to 15 are commutative, so they are self-opposite. The rings, that are not self-opposite, appear for the first time among the rings of order 16. There are 4 different non-self-opposite rings out of the total number of 50 rings with unity having 16 elements (37 commutative and 13 noncommutative). They can be coupled in two pairs of rings opposite to each other in a pair, and necessarily with the same additive group, since an antiisomorphism of rings is an isomorphism of their additive groups.

One pair of rings $R_1$ and $R_2 = R_1^\text{op}$ has the additive group $\mathrm{C}_4 \times \mathrm{C}_2 \times \mathrm{C}_2$ and the other pair $R_3$ and $R_4 = R_3^\text{op}$, the group $\mathrm{C}_2 \times \mathrm{C}_2 \times \mathrm{C}_2 \times \mathrm{C}_2 = \mathrm{C}_2^4$. Their tables of operations are not presented in this article, as they can be found in the source cited, and it can be verified that $R_3^\text{op} = R_4$, they are opposite, but not isomorphic. The same is true for the pair $R_1$ and $R_2$, however, the ring $\widetilde{R}_2$ listed in "The Book of the Rings" is not equal but only isomorphic to $R_2$.

The remaining 13 − 4 = 9 noncommutative rings are self-opposite.

=== Free algebra with two generators ===
The free algebra $k \langle x,y \rangle$ over a field $k$ with generators $x, y$ has multiplication from the multiplication of words. For example,

$$\begin{align}
(2x^2yx + 3yxy)\cdot(xyxy + 1) =& \text{ } 2x^2yx^2yxy + 2x^2yx \\
& + 3yxyxyxy + 3yxy .
\end{align}$$

Then the opposite algebra has multiplication given by

$$\begin{align}
(2x^2yx + 3yxy)*(xyxy + 1) &= (xyxy + 1)\cdot (2x^2yx + 3yxy)\\
&= 2xyxyx^2yx + 3xyxy^2xy + 2x^2yx + 3yxy ,
\end{align}$$

which are not equal elements.

=== Quaternion algebra ===
The quaternion algebra $H(a,b)$ over a field $F$ with $a,b \in F^\times$ is a defined by three generators $i, j, k$ with the relations

$$i^2 = a,\ j^2 = b,\ k = ij = -ji$$

All elements $x \in H(a,b)$ are of the form

$x = x_0 + x_ii + x_jj + x_kk$, where $x_0, x_i, x_j, x_k \in F$

For example, if $F = \R$, then $H(-1,-1)$ is the algebra of quaternions, and $H(-1,+1)$ is that of split-quaternions.

If the multiplication of $H(a,b)$ is denoted $\cdot$, it has the multiplication table

| $\cdot$ | $i$ | $j$ | $k$ |
|---|---|---|---|
| $i$ | $a$ | $k$ | $aj$ |
| $j$ | $-k$ | $b$ | $-bi$ |
| $k$ | $-aj$ | $bi$ | $-ab$ |

Then the opposite algebra $H(a,b)^\text{op}$ with multiplication denoted $*$ has the table

| $*$ | $i$ | $j$ | $k$ |
|---|---|---|---|
| $i$ | $a$ | $-k$ | $-aj$ |
| $j$ | $k$ | $b$ | $bi$ |
| $k$ | $aj$ | $-bi$ | $-ab$ |

=== Commutative ring ===
A commutative ring $(R,\cdot)$ is isomorphic to its opposite ring $(R,*) = R^\text{op}$ since $x \cdot y = y \cdot x = x * y$ for all $x$ and $y$ in $R$. They are even equal $(R,*)=(R,\cdot)$, since their operations are equal, i.e. $* = \cdot$.

== Properties ==
- Two rings R_{1} and R_{2} are isomorphic if and only if their corresponding opposite rings are isomorphic.
- The opposite of the opposite of a ring R is identical with R, that is (R^{op})^{op} = R.
- A ring and its opposite ring are anti-isomorphic.
- A ring is commutative if and only if its operation coincides with its opposite operation.
- The left ideals of a ring are the right ideals of its opposite.
- The opposite ring of a division ring is a division ring.
- A left module over a ring is a right module over its opposite, and vice versa.

== See also ==
- Opposite group
- Opposite category
