= Field with one element =

Theoretical object in mathematics

In mathematics, the field with one element is a suggestive name for an object that should behave similarly to a finite field with a single element, if such a field could exist. This object is denoted F_{1}, or, in a French–English pun, F_{un}. The name "field with one element" and the notation F_{1} are only suggestive, as there is no field with one element in classical abstract algebra. Instead, F_{1} refers to the idea that there should be a way to replace sets and operations, the traditional building blocks for abstract algebra, with other, more flexible objects. Many theories of F_{1} have been proposed, but it is not clear which, if any, of them give F_{1} all the desired properties. While there is still no field with a single element in these theories, there is a field-like object whose characteristic is one.

Most proposed theories of F_{1} replace abstract algebra entirely. Mathematical objects such as vector spaces and polynomial rings can be carried over into these new theories by mimicking their abstract properties. This allows the development of commutative algebra and algebraic geometry on new foundations. One of the defining features of theories of F_{1} is that these new foundations allow more objects than classical abstract algebra does, one of which behaves like a field of characteristic one.

The possibility of studying the mathematics of F_{1} was originally suggested in 1956 by Jacques Tits, published in Tits 1957, on the basis of an analogy between symmetries in projective geometry and the combinatorics of simplicial complexes. F_{1} has been connected to noncommutative geometry and to a possible proof of the Riemann hypothesis.

== History ==
In 1957, Jacques Tits introduced the theory of buildings, which relate algebraic groups to abstract simplicial complexes. One of the assumptions is a non-triviality condition: If the building is an n‑dimensional abstract simplicial complex, and if k < n, then every k‑simplex of the building must be contained in at least three n‑simplices. This is analogous to the condition in classical projective geometry that a line must contain at least three points. However, there are degenerate geometries that satisfy all the conditions to be a projective geometry except that the lines admit only two points. The analogous objects in the theory of buildings are called apartments. Apartments play such a constituent role in the theory of buildings that Tits conjectured the existence of a theory of projective geometry in which the degenerate geometries would have equal standing with the classical ones. This geometry would take place, he said, over a field of characteristic one. Using this analogy it was possible to describe some of the elementary properties of F_{1}, but it was not possible to construct it.

After Tits' initial observations, little progress was made until the early 1990s. In the late 1980s, Alexander Smirnov gave a series of talks in which he conjectured that the Riemann hypothesis could be proven by considering the integers as a curve over a field with one element. By 1991, Smirnov had taken some steps towards algebraic geometry over F_{1}, introducing extensions of F_{1} and using them to handle the projective line P^{1} over F_{1}. Algebraic numbers were treated as maps to this P^{1}, and conjectural approximations to the Riemann–Hurwitz formula for these maps were suggested. These approximations imply solutions to important problems like the abc conjecture. The extensions of F_{1} later on were denoted as F_{q} with q = 1^{n}. Together with Mikhail Kapranov, Smirnov went on to explore how algebraic and number-theoretic constructions in prime characteristic might look in "characteristic one", culminating in an unpublished work released in 1995. In 1993, Yuri Manin gave a series of lectures on zeta functions where he proposed developing a theory of algebraic geometry over F_{1}. He suggested that zeta functions of varieties over F_{1} would have very simple descriptions, and he proposed a relation between the K‑theory of F_{1} and the homotopy groups of spheres. This inspired several people to attempt to construct explicit theories of F_{1}‑geometry.

The first published definition of a variety over F_{1} came from Christophe Soulé in 1999, who constructed it using algebras over the complex numbers and functors from categories of certain rings. In 2000, Zhu proposed that F_{1} was the same as F_{2} except that the sum of one and one was one, not zero. Deitmar suggested that F_{1} should be found by forgetting the additive structure of a ring and focusing on the multiplication. Toën and Vaquié built on Hakim's theory of relative schemes and defined F_{1} using symmetric monoidal categories. Their construction was later shown to be equivalent to Deitmar's by Vezzani. Nikolai Durov constructed F_{1} as a commutative algebraic monad. Borger used descent to construct it from the finite fields and the integers.

Alain Connes and Caterina Consani developed both Soulé and Deitmar's notions by "gluing" the category of multiplicative monoids and the category of rings to create a new category $\mathfrak{M}\mathfrak{R},$ then defining F_{1}‑schemes to be a particular kind of representable functor on $\mathfrak{M}\mathfrak{R}.$ Using this, they managed to provide a notion of several number-theoretic constructions over F_{1} such as motives and field extensions, as well as constructing Chevalley groups over F_{1^{2}}. Along with Matilde Marcolli, Connes and Consani have also connected F_{1} with noncommutative geometry. It has also been suggested to have connections to the unique games conjecture in computational complexity theory.

Oliver Lorscheid, along with others, has recently achieved Tits' original aim of describing Chevalley groups over F_{1} by introducing objects called blueprints, which are a simultaneous generalisation of both semirings and monoids. These are used to define so-called "blue schemes", one of which is Spec F_{1}. Lorscheid's ideas depart somewhat from other ideas of groups over F_{1}, in that the F_{1}‑scheme is not itself the Weyl group of its base extension to normal schemes. Lorscheid first defines the Tits category, a full subcategory of the category of blue schemes, and defines the "Weyl extension", a functor from the Tits category to Set. A Tits–Weyl model of an algebraic group $\mathcal{G}$ is a blue scheme G with a group operation that is a morphism in the Tits category, whose base extension is $\mathcal{G}$ and whose Weyl extension is isomorphic to the Weyl group of $\mathcal{G}.$

F_{1}‑geometry has been linked to tropical geometry, via the fact that semirings (in particular, tropical semirings) arise as quotients of some monoid semiring N[A] of finite formal sums of elements of a monoid A, which is itself an F_{1}‑algebra. This connection is made explicit by Lorscheid's use of blueprints. The Giansiracusa brothers have constructed a tropical scheme theory, for which their category of tropical schemes is equivalent to the category of Toën–Vaquié F_{1}‑schemes. This category embeds faithfully, but not fully, into the category of blue schemes, and is a full subcategory of the category of Durov schemes.

== Motivations ==
=== Algebraic number theory ===
One motivation for F_{1} comes from algebraic number theory. André Weil's proof of the Riemann hypothesis for curves over finite fields starts with a curve C over a finite field k, which comes equipped with a function field F, which is a field extension of k. Each such function field gives rise to a Hasse–Weil zeta function ζ_{F}, and the Riemann hypothesis for finite fields determines the zeroes of ζ_{F}. Weil's proof then uses various geometric properties of C to study ζ_{F}.

The field of rational numbers Q is linked in a similar way to the Riemann zeta function, but Q is not the function field of a variety. Instead, Q is the function field of the scheme Spec Z. This is a one-dimensional scheme (also known as an algebraic curve), and so there should be some "base field" that this curve lies over, of which Q would be a field extension (in the same way that C is a curve over k, and F is an extension of k). The hope of F_{1}‑geometry is that a suitable object F_{1} could play the role of this base field, which would allow for a proof of the Riemann hypothesis by mimicking Weil's proof with F_{1} in place of k.

=== Arakelov geometry ===
Geometry over a field with one element is also motivated by Arakelov geometry, where Diophantine equations are studied using tools from complex geometry. The theory involves complicated comparisons between finite fields and the complex numbers. Here the existence of F_{1} is useful for technical reasons.

== Expected properties ==
=== F_{1} is not a field ===
F_{1} cannot be a field because by definition all fields must contain two distinct elements, the additive identity zero and the multiplicative identity one. Even if this restriction is dropped (for instance by letting the additive and multiplicative identities be the same element), a ring with one element must be the zero ring, which does not behave like a finite field. For instance, all modules over the zero ring are isomorphic (as the only element of such a module is the zero element). However, one of the key motivations of F_{1} is the description of sets as "F_{1}‑vector spaces" – if finite sets were modules over the zero ring, then every finite set would be the same size, which is not the case. Moreover, the spectrum of the trivial ring is empty, but the spectrum of a field has one point.

=== Other properties ===
- Finite sets are both affine spaces and projective spaces over F_{1}.
- Pointed sets are vector spaces over F_{1}.
- The finite fields F_{q} are quantum deformations of F_{1}, where q is the deformation.
- Weyl groups are simple algebraic groups over F_{1}:
  Given a Dynkin diagram for a semisimple algebraic group, its Weyl group is the semisimple algebraic group over F_{1}.
- The affine scheme Spec Z is a curve over F_{1}.
- Groups are Hopf algebras over F_{1}. More generally, anything defined purely in terms of diagrams of algebraic objects should have an F_{1}‑analog in the category of sets.
- Group actions on sets are projective representations of G over F_{1}, and in this way, G is the group Hopf algebra F_{1}[G].
- Toric varieties determine F_{1}‑varieties. In some descriptions of F_{1}‑geometry the converse is also true, in the sense that the extension of scalars of F_{1}‑varieties to Z are toric. Whilst other approaches to F_{1}‑geometry admit wider classes of examples, toric varieties appear to lie at the very heart of the theory.
- The zeta function of P^{N}(F_{1}) should be ζ(s) = s(s − 1)⋯(s − N).
- The mth K‑group of F_{1} should be the mth stable homotopy group of the sphere spectrum.

== Computations ==
Various structures on a set are analogous to structures on a projective space, and can be computed in the same way:

=== Sets are projective spaces ===
The number of elements of P(F^{n}_{q}) = P^{n−1}(F_{q}), the (n − 1)‑dimensional projective space over the finite field F_{q}, is the q‑integer
$$[n]_q := \frac{q^n-1}{q-1}=1+q+q^2+\dots+q^{n-1}.$$
Taking q = 1 yields [n]_{q} = n.

The expansion of the q‑integer into a sum of powers of q corresponds to the Schubert cell decomposition of projective space.

=== Permutations are maximal flags ===
There are n! permutations of a set with n elements, and [n]!_{q} maximal flags in F^{n}_{q}, where
$$[n]!_q := [1]_q [2]_q \dots [n]_q$$
is the q‑factorial. Indeed, a permutation of a set can be considered a filtered set, as a flag is a filtered vector space: for instance, the ordering (0, 1, 2) of the set {0, 1, 2} corresponds to the filtration {0} ⊂ {0, 1} ⊂ {0, 1, 2}.

=== Subsets are subspaces ===
The binomial coefficient
$$\frac{n!}{m!(n-m)!}$$
gives the number of m-element subsets of an n-element set, and the q‑binomial coefficient
$$\frac{[n]!_q}{[m]!_q[n-m]!_q}$$
gives the number of m-dimensional subspaces of an n-dimensional vector space over F_{q}.

The expansion of the q‑binomial coefficient into a sum of powers of q corresponds to the Schubert cell decomposition of the Grassmannian.

== Monoid schemes ==
Deitmar's construction of monoid schemes has been called "the very core of F_{1}‑geometry", as most other theories of F_{1}‑geometry contain descriptions of monoid schemes. Morally, it mimicks the theory of schemes developed in the 1950s and 1960s by replacing commutative rings with monoids. The effect of this is to "forget" the additive structure of the ring, leaving only the multiplicative structure. For this reason, it is sometimes called "non-additive geometry".

=== Monoids ===
A multiplicative monoid is a monoid A that also contains an absorbing element 0 (distinct from the identity 1 of the monoid), such that 0a = 0 for every a in the monoid A. The field with one element is then defined to be F_{1} = {0, 1}, the multiplicative monoid of the field with two elements, which is initial in the category of multiplicative monoids. A monoid ideal in a monoid A is a subset I that is multiplicatively closed, contains 0, and such that IA = {ra : r ∈ I, a ∈ A} = I. Such an ideal is prime if A ∖ I is multiplicatively closed and contains 1.

For monoids A and B, a monoid homomorphism is a function f : A → B such that

- $f(0) = 0 ;$
- $f(1) = 1 ,$ and
- $f(ab) = f(a)f(b)$ for every $a$ and $b$ in $A .$

=== Monoid schemes ===
The spectrum of a monoid A, denoted Spec A, is the set of prime ideals of A. The spectrum of a monoid can be given a Zariski topology, by defining basic open sets
$$U_h = \{\mathfrak{p}\in\text{Spec}A:h\notin\mathfrak{p}\},$$
for each h in A. A monoidal space is a topological space along with a sheaf of multiplicative monoids called the structure sheaf. An affine monoid scheme is a monoidal space that is isomorphic to the spectrum of a monoid, and a monoid scheme is a sheaf of monoids that has an open cover by affine monoid schemes.

Monoid schemes can be turned into ring-theoretic schemes by means of a base extension functor – ⊗_{F_{1}} Z that sends the monoid A to the Z‑module (i.e. ring) Z[A] / ⟨0_{A}⟩, and a monoid homomorphism f : A → B extends to a ring homomorphism f_{Z} : A ⊗_{F_{1}} Z → B ⊗_{F_{1}} Z that is linear as a Z‑module homomorphism. The base extension of an affine monoid scheme is defined via the formula
$$\operatorname{Spec}(A)\times_{\operatorname{Spec}(\mathbf{F}_1)}\operatorname{Spec}(\mathbf{Z})=\operatorname{Spec}\big( A\otimes_{\mathbf{F}_1}\mathbf{Z}\big),$$
which in turn defines the base extension of a general monoid scheme.

=== Consequences ===
This construction achieves many of the desired properties of F_{1}‑geometry: Spec F_{1} consists of a single point, so behaves similarly to the spectrum of a field in conventional geometry, and the category of affine monoid schemes is dual to the category of multiplicative monoids, mirroring the duality of affine schemes and commutative rings. Furthermore, this theory satisfies the combinatorial properties expected of F_{1} mentioned in previous sections; for instance, projective space over F_{1} of dimension n as a monoid scheme is identical to an apartment of projective space over F_{q} of dimension n when described as a building.

However, monoid schemes do not fulfill all of the expected properties of a theory of F_{1}‑geometry, as the only varieties that have monoid scheme analogues are toric varieties. More precisely, if X is a monoid scheme whose base extension is a flat, separated, connected scheme of finite type, then the base extension of X is a toric variety. Other notions of F_{1}‑geometry, such as that of Connes–Consani, build on this model to describe F_{1}‑varieties that are not toric.

== Field extensions ==
One may define field extensions of the field with one element as the group of roots of unity, or more finely (with a geometric structure) as the group scheme of roots of unity. This is non-naturally isomorphic to the cyclic group of order n, the isomorphism depending on choice of a primitive root of unity:
$$\mathbf{F}_{1^n} = \mu_n.$$
Thus a vector space of dimension d over F_{1^{n}} is a finite set of order dn on which the roots of unity act freely, together with a base point.

From this point of view the finite field F_{q} is an algebra over F_{1^{n}}, of dimension d = (q − 1)/n for any n that is a factor of q − 1 (for example n = q − 1 or n = 1). This corresponds to the fact that the group of units of a finite field F_{q} (which are the q − 1 non-zero elements) is a cyclic group of order q − 1, on which any cyclic group of order dividing q − 1 acts freely (by raising to a power), and the zero element of the field is the base point.

Similarly, the real numbers R are an algebra over F_{1^{2}}, of infinite dimension, as the real numbers contain ±1, but no other roots of unity, and the complex numbers C are an algebra over F_{1^{n}} for all n, again of infinite dimension, as the complex numbers have all roots of unity.

From this point of view, any phenomenon that only depends on a field having roots of unity can be seen as coming from F_{1} – for example, the discrete Fourier transform (complex-valued) and the related number-theoretic transform (Z/nZ‑valued).

== See also ==
- Arithmetic derivative
- Semigroup with one element

== Bibliography ==
- Borger, James (2009), Λ‑rings and the field with one element, arXiv:0906.3146
- Consani, Caterina; Connes, Alain, eds. (2011), Noncommutative geometry, arithmetic, and related topics. Proceedings of the 21st meeting of the Japan-U.S. Mathematics Institute (JAMI) held at Johns Hopkins University, Baltimore, MD, USA, March 23–26, 2009, Baltimore, MD: Johns Hopkins University Press, ISBN 978-1-4214-0352-6, Zbl 1245.00040
- Connes, Alain; Consani, Caterina; Marcolli, Matilde (2009), "Fun with $\mathbb{F}_1$", Journal of Number Theory, 129 (6): 1532–1561, arXiv:0806.2401, doi:10.1016/j.jnt.2008.08.007, MR 2521492, S2CID 5327852, Zbl 1228.11143
- Connes, Alain; Consani, Caterina (2010), "Schemes over F_{1} and zeta functions", Compositio Mathematica, 146 (6), London Mathematical Society: 1383–1415, arXiv:0903.2024, doi:10.1112/S0010437X09004692, S2CID 14448430
- Deitmar, Anton (2005), "Schemes over F_{1}", in van der Geer, G.; Moonen, B.; Schoof, R. (eds.), Number Fields and Function Fields: Two Parallel Worlds, Progress in Mathematics, vol. 239
- Deitmar, Anton (2006), F_{1}‑schemes and toric varieties, arXiv:math/0608179, Bibcode:2006math......8179D
- Durov, Nikolai (2008), "New Approach to Arakelov Geometry", arXiv:0704.2030 [math.AG]
- Giansiracusa, Jeffrey; Giansiracusa, Noah (2016), "Equations of tropical varieties", Duke Mathematical Journal, 165 (18): 3379–3433, arXiv:1308.0042, doi:10.1215/00127094-3645544, S2CID 16276528
- Kapranov, Mikhail; Smirnov, Alexander (1995), Cohomology determinants and reciprocity laws: number field case (PDF)
- Le Bruyn, Lieven (2009), "(non)commutative f‑un geometry", arXiv:0909.2522 [math.RA]
- Lescot, Paul (2009), Algebre absolue (PDF), archived from the original (PDF) on 27 July 2011
- López Peña, Javier; Lorscheid, Oliver (2011), "Mapping F_{1}‑land: An overview of geometries over the field with one element", Noncommutative Geometry, Arithmetic, and Related Topics: 241–265, arXiv:0909.0069
- Lorscheid, Oliver (2009), "Algebraic groups over the field with one element", arXiv:0907.3824 [math.AG]
- Lorscheid, Oliver (2016), "A blueprinted view on F_{1}‑geometry", in Koen, Thas (ed.), Absolute arithmetic and F_{1}‑geometry, European Mathematical Society Publishing House, arXiv:1301.0083
- Lorscheid, Oliver (2018a), "F_{1} for everyone", Jahresbericht der Deutschen Mathematiker-Vereinigung, 120 (2), Springer: 83–116, arXiv:1801.05337, doi:10.1365/s13291-018-0177-x, S2CID 119664210
- Lorscheid, Oliver (2018b), "The geometry of blueprints part II: Tits–Weyl models of algebraic groups", Forum of Mathematics, Sigma, 6 e20, arXiv:1201.1324, doi:10.1017/fms.2018.17, S2CID 117587513
- Lorscheid, Oliver (2015), Scheme-theoretic tropicalization, arXiv:1508.07949
- Manin, Yuri (1995), "Lectures on zeta functions and motives (according to Deninger and Kurokawa)" (PDF), Astérisque, 228 (4): 121–163
- Scholze, Peter (2017), p‑adic geometry, p. 13, arXiv:1712.03708
- Smirnov, Alexander (1992), "Hurwitz inequalities for number fields" (PDF), Algebra i Analiz (in Russian), 4 (2): 186–209
- Soulé, Christophe (1999), On the field with one element (exposé à l'Arbeitstagung, Bonn, June 1999) (PDF), Preprint IHES
- Soulé, Christophe (2003), Les variétés sur le corps à un élément (in French), arXiv:math/0304444, Bibcode:2003math......4444S
- Tits, Jacques (1957), "Sur les analogues algébriques des groupes semi-simples complexes", Colloque d'algèbre supérieure, tenu à Bruxelles du 19 au 22 décembre 1956, Centre Belge de Recherches Mathématiques Établissements Ceuterick, Louvain, Paris: Librairie Gauthier-Villars, pp. 261–289
- Toën, Bertrand; Vaquié, Michel (2005), Au dessous de Spec Z, arXiv:math/0509684
- Vezzani, Alberto (2010), "Deitmar's versus Toën-Vaquié's schemes over F_{1}", Mathematische Zeitschrift, 271: 1–16, arXiv:1005.0287, doi:10.1007/s00209-011-0896-5, hdl:2434/771406, S2CID 119145251
