= Affine monoid =

Finitelt generated commutative monoid

In abstract algebra, a branch of mathematics, an affine monoid is a commutative monoid that is finitely generated, and is isomorphic to a submonoid of a free abelian group $\mathbb{Z}^d, d \ge 0$. Affine monoids are closely connected to convex polyhedra, and their associated algebras are of much use in the algebraic study of these geometric objects.

== Characterization ==
- Affine monoids are finitely generated. This means for a monoid $M$, there exists $m_1, \dots , m_n \in M$ such that

$$M = m_1\mathbb{Z_+}+\dots + m_n\mathbb{Z_+}$$.

- Affine monoids are cancellative. In other words,

$x + y = x + z$ implies that $y = z$ for all $x,y,z \in M$, where $+$ denotes the binary operation on the affine monoid $M$.

- Affine monoids are also torsion free. For an affine monoid $M$, $nx = ny$ implies that $x = y$ for $n \in \mathbb{N}$, and $x, y \in M$.

=== Properties and examples ===
- Every submonoid of $\mathbb{Z}$ is finitely generated. Hence, every submonoid of $\mathbb{Z}$ is affine.
- The submonoid $\{(x,y)\in \mathbb{Z} \times \mathbb{Z} \mid y > 0\} \cup \{(0,0)\}$ of $\mathbb{Z} \times \mathbb{Z}$ is not finitely generated, and therefore not affine.
- The intersection of two affine monoids is an affine monoid.

== Affine monoids ==
=== Group of differences ===
If $M$ is an affine monoid, it can be embedded into a group. More specifically, there is a unique group $gp(M)$, called the group of differences, in which $M$ can be embedded.

==== Definition ====
- $gp(M)$ can be viewed as the set of equivalences classes $x - y$, where $x - y = u - v$ if and only if $x + v + z = u + y + z$, for $z \in M$, and

$(x-y) + (u-v) = (x+u) - (y+v)$ defines the addition.

- The rank of an affine monoid $M$ is the rank of a group of $gp(M)$.
- If an affine monoid $M$ is given as a submonoid of $\mathbb{Z}^r$, then $gp(M) \cong \mathbb{Z}M$, where $\mathbb{Z}M$ is the subgroup of $\mathbb{Z}^r$.

==== Universal property ====
- If $M$ is an affine monoid, then the monoid homomorphism $\iota : M \to gp(M)$ defined by $\iota(x) = x + 0$ satisfies the following universal property:

for any monoid homomorphism $\varphi: M \to G$, where $G$ is a group, there is a unique group homomorphism $\psi : gp(M) \to G$, such that $\varphi = \psi \circ \iota$, and since affine monoids are cancellative, it follows that $\iota$ is an embedding. In other words, every affine monoid can be embedded into a group.

=== Normal affine monoids ===
==== Definition ====
- If $M$ is a submonoid of an affine monoid $N$, then the submonoid

$$\hat{M}_N = \{x\in N \mid mx \in M, m \in \mathbb{N}\}$$

is the integral closure of $M$ in $N$. If $M = \hat{M_N}$, then $M$ is integrally closed.

- The normalization of an affine monoid $M$ is the integral closure of $M$ in $gp(M)$. If the normalization of $M$, is $M$ itself, then $M$ is a normal affine monoid.
- A monoid $M$ is a normal affine monoid if and only if $\mathbb{R}_+M$ is finitely generated and $M = \mathbb{Z}^r \cap \mathbb{R}_+M$ .

== Affine monoid rings ==
Let $M$ be an affine monoid, and $R$ a commutative ring. Then one can form the affine monoid ring $R[M]$. This is an $R$-module with a free basis $M$, so if $f \in R[M]$, then

$f = \sum_{i=1}^{n}f_{i}x_i$, where $f_i \in R, x_i \in M$, and $n \in \mathbb{N}$.

In other words, $R[M]$ is the set of finite sums of elements of $M$ with coefficients in $R$.

$R[M]$ is a domain since, for some $d \geq 0$, it embeds in $R[\Z^d]$ which is a domain.

== Connection to convex geometry ==
Affine monoids arise naturally from convex polyhedra, convex cones, and their associated discrete structures.

- Let $C$ be a rational convex cone in $\mathbb{R}^n$, and let $L$ be a lattice in $\mathbb{Q}^n$. Then $C \cap L$ is an affine monoid. (Lemma 2.9, Gordan's lemma)
- If $M$ is a submonoid of $\mathbb{R}^n$, then $\mathbb{R}_+M$ is a cone if and only if $M$ is an affine monoid.
- If $M$ is a submonoid of $\mathbb{R}^n$, and $C$ is a cone generated by the elements of $gp(M)$, then $M \cap C$ is an affine monoid.
- Let $P$ in $\mathbb{R}^n$ be a rational polyhedron, $C$ the recession cone of $P$, and $L$ a lattice in $\mathbb{Q}^n$. Then $P \cap L$ is a finitely generated module over the affine monoid $C \cap L$. (Theorem 2.12)

== See also ==
- Monoid
- Convex cone
- Convex polytope
- Lattice (group)
- K-theory
