= Trivial group =

Group that has only one element

In mathematics, a trivial group or zero group is a group that consists of a single element. All such groups are isomorphic, so one often speaks of the trivial group. The single element of the trivial group is the identity element and so it is usually denoted as such: $0$, $1$, or $\mathrm{e}$ depending on the context. If the group operation is denoted $\, \cdot \,$ then it is defined by $\mathrm{e} \cdot \mathrm{e} = \mathrm{e}$.

The similarly defined trivial monoid is also a group since its only element is its own inverse, and is hence the same as the trivial group.

The trivial group is distinct from the empty set, which has no elements, hence lacks an identity element, and so cannot be a group.

== Definitions ==
Given any group $G$, the group that consists of only the identity element is a subgroup of $G$, and, being the trivial group, is called the trivial subgroup of $G$.

The term, when referred to "$G$ has no nontrivial proper subgroups" refers to the only subgroups of $G$ being the trivial group $\{ \mathrm{e} \}$ and the group $G$ itself.

== Properties ==
The trivial group is cyclic of order $1$; as such it may be denoted $\mathrm{Z}_1$ or $\mathrm{C}_1$. If the group operation is called addition, the trivial group is usually denoted by $0$. If the group operation is called multiplication then $1$ can be a notation for the trivial group. Combining these leads to the trivial ring in which the addition and multiplication operations are identical and $0 = 1$.

Trivial group is the only group with exactly one subgroup. All other groups have at least two subgroups, trivial group and itself. Trivial group has no proper subgroups.

The trivial group serves as the zero object in the category of groups, meaning it is both an initial object and a terminal object.

The trivial group can be made a (bi-)ordered group by equipping it with the trivial non-strict order $\,\leq$.

== See also ==
- Zero object (algebra) – Algebraic structure with only one element
- List of small groups
