= Band (algebra) =

Semigroup in which every element is idempotent

In mathematics, a band (also called idempotent semigroup) is a semigroup in which every element is idempotent (in other words equal to its own square). Bands were first studied and named by A. H. Clifford (1954).

The lattice of varieties of bands was described independently in the early 1970s by Biryukov, Fennemore and Gerhard. Semilattices, left-zero bands, right-zero bands, rectangular bands, normal bands, left-regular bands, right-regular bands and regular bands are specific subclasses of bands that lie near the bottom of this lattice and which are of particular interest; they are briefly described below.

== Varieties of bands ==
A class of bands forms a variety if it is closed under formation of subsemigroups, homomorphic images and direct products. Each variety of bands can be defined by a single defining identity.

=== Semilattices ===
Semilattices are exactly commutative bands; that is, they are the bands satisfying the equation

- xy = yx for all x and y.

Bands induce a preorder that may be defined as $x \leq y$ if $x y = x$ . Requiring commutativity implies that this preorder becomes a (semilattice) partial order.

=== Zero bands ===
A left-zero band is a band satisfying the equation

- xy = x,

whence its Cayley table has constant rows.

Symmetrically, a right-zero band is one satisfying

- xy = y,

so that the Cayley table has constant columns.

=== Rectangular bands ===
A rectangular band is a band S that satisfies

1. xyx = x for all x, y ∈ S, or equivalently,
2. xyz = xz for all x, y, z ∈ S,

In any semigroup, the first identity is sufficient to characterize a nowhere commutative semigroup, the proof of this follows.

Let a semigroup be nowhere commutative. In any flexible magma $(aa)a = a(aa)$ so every element commutes with its square. So in any nowhere commutative semigroup every element is idempotent which means it is a band. Thus in any nowhere commutative semigroup
$$x(xyx) = (xx)yx = xyx = xy(xx) = (xyx)x.$$

So $x$ commutes with $xyx$ and thus $xyx = x$ which is the first characteristic identity.

Now assume that the first identity holds in a semigroup. This identity implies idempotence: $a = aaa$ so $aa = aaaa = a(aa)a = a$ and also the following implication holds in any semigroup: $xy = yx \implies (xy)(yx) = (yx)(xy)$. So this semigroup which is a band is actually a nowhere commutative semigroup:

$$xy = yx \implies x = xyx = x(yy)x = (xy)(yx) = (yx)(xy) = y(xx)y = yxy = y$$.

In any semigroup the first identity also implies the second because xyz = xy(zxz) = (x(yz)x)z = xz.

The idempotents of a rectangular semigroup form a sub band that is a rectangular band but a rectangular semigroup may have elements that are not idempotent. In a band the second identity obviously implies the first but that requires idempotence. There exist semigroups that satisfy the second identity but are not bands and do not satisfy the first.

There is a complete classification of rectangular bands. Given arbitrary sets I and J one can define a magma operation on I × J by setting
$$(i, j) \cdot (k, \ell) = (i, \ell) \,$$

This operation is associative because for any three pairs (i_{x}, j_{x}), (i_{y}, j_{y}), (i_{z}, j_{z}) we have

$((i_x, j_x) \cdot (i_y, j_y)) \cdot (i_z, j_z) = (i_x, j_y) \cdot (i_z, j_z) = (i_x, j_z) = (i_x, j_x) \cdot (i_z, j_z)$ and likewise
$$(i_x, j_x) \cdot ((i_y, j_y) \cdot (i_z, j_z)) = (i_x, j_x) \cdot (i_y, j_z) = (i_x, j_z) = (i_x, j_x) \cdot (i_z, j_z)$$

These two magma identities (xy)z = xz and x(yz) = xz are together equivalent to the second characteristic identity above.

The two together also imply associativity (xy)z =x(yz). Any magma that satisfies these two rectangular identities and idempotence is therefore a rectangular band. So any magma that satisfies both the characteristic identities (four separate magma identities) is a band and therefore a rectangular band.

The magma operation defined above is a rectangular band because for any pair (i, j) we have (i, j) · (i, j) = (i, j) so every element is idempotent and the first characteristic identity follows from the second together with idempotence.

But a magma that satisfies only the identities for the first characteristic and idempotence need not be associative so the second characteristic only follows from the first in a semigroup.

Any rectangular band is isomorphic to one of the above form (either $S$ is empty, or pick any element $e\in S$, and then ($s\mapsto (se,es)$) defines an isomorphism $S\cong Se\times eS$). Left-zero and right-zero bands are rectangular bands, and in fact every rectangular band is isomorphic to a direct product of a left-zero band and a right-zero band. All rectangular bands of prime order are zero bands, either left or right. A rectangular band is said to be purely rectangular if it is not a left-zero or right-zero band.

In categorical language, one can say that the category of nonempty rectangular bands is equivalent to $\mathrm{Set}_{\ne \emptyset} \times \mathrm{Set}_{\ne \emptyset}$, where $\mathrm{Set}_{\ne \emptyset}$ is the category with nonempty sets as objects and functions as morphisms. This implies not only that every nonempty rectangular band is isomorphic to one coming from a pair of sets, but also these sets are uniquely determined up to a canonical isomorphism, and all homomorphisms between bands come from pairs of functions between sets. If the set I is empty in the above result, the rectangular band I × J is independent of J, and vice versa. This is why the above result only gives an equivalence between nonempty rectangular bands and pairs of nonempty sets.

Rectangular bands are also the T-algebras, where T is the monad on Set with T(X)=X×X, T(f)=f×f, $\eta_X$ being the diagonal map $X \to X \times X$, and $\mu_X ((x_{11}, x_{12}), (x_{21}, x_{22}))=(x_{11}, x_{22})$.

=== Normal bands ===
A normal band is a band S satisfying

- zxyz = zyxz for all x, y, and z ∈ S.

We can also say a normal band is a band S satisfying

- axyb = ayxb for all a, b, x, and y ∈ S.

This is the same equation used to define medial magmas, so a normal band may also be called a medial band, and normal bands are examples of medial magmas.

=== Left-regular bands ===
A left-regular band is a band S satisfying

- xyx = xy for all x, y ∈ S

If we take a semigroup and define a ≤ b if ab = b, we obtain a partial ordering if and only if this semigroup is a left-regular band. Left-regular bands thus show up naturally in the study of posets.

=== Right-regular bands ===
A right-regular band is a band S satisfying

- xyx = yx for all x, y ∈ S

Any right-regular band becomes a left-regular band using the opposite product. Indeed, every variety of bands has an 'opposite' version; this gives rise to the reflection symmetry in the figure below.

=== Regular bands ===
A regular band is a band S satisfying

- zxzyz = zxyz for all x, y, z ∈ S

=== Lattice of varieties ===
Lattice of varieties of regular bands.

When partially ordered by inclusion, varieties of bands naturally form a lattice, in which the meet of two varieties is their intersection and the join of two varieties is the smallest variety that contains both of them. The complete structure of this lattice is known; in particular, it is countable, complete, and distributive. The sublattice consisting of the 13 varieties of regular bands is shown in the figure. The varieties of left-zero bands, semilattices, and right-zero bands are the three atoms (non-trivial minimal elements) of this lattice.

Each variety of bands shown in the figure is defined by just one identity. This is not a coincidence: in fact, every variety of bands can be defined by a single identity.

== See also ==
- Boolean ring, a ring in which every element is (multiplicatively) idempotent
- Nowhere commutative semigroup
- Special classes of semigroups
- Orthodox semigroup
- Reversible cellular automaton § One-dimensional automata
