= Antiisomorphism =

Isomorphism from A to the opposite of B

Two antiisomorphic digraphs

In category theory, a branch of mathematics, an antiisomorphism (or anti-isomorphism) between structured sets A and B is an isomorphism from A to the opposite of B (or equivalently from the opposite of A to B). If there exists an antiisomorphism between two structures, they are said to be antiisomorphic.

Intuitively, to say that two mathematical structures are antiisomorphic is to say that they are basically opposites of one another.

The concept is particularly useful in an algebraic setting, as, for instance, when applied to rings.

== Simple example ==
Let A be the binary relation (or directed graph) consisting of elements {1,2,3} and binary relation $\rightarrow$ defined as follows:

- $1 \rightarrow 2,$
- $1 \rightarrow 3,$
- $2 \rightarrow 1.$

Let B be the binary relation set consisting of elements {a,b,c} and binary relation $\Rightarrow$ defined as follows:

- $b \Rightarrow a,$
- $c \Rightarrow a,$
- $a \Rightarrow b.$

Note that the opposite of B (denoted B^{op}) is the same set of elements with the opposite binary relation $\Leftarrow$ (that is, reverse all the arcs of the directed graph):

- $b \Leftarrow a,$
- $c \Leftarrow a,$
- $a \Leftarrow b.$

If we replace a, b, and c with 1, 2, and 3 respectively, we see that each rule in B^{op} is the same as some rule in A. That is, we can define an isomorphism $\phi$ from A to B^{op} by $\phi(1) = a, \phi(2) = b, \phi(3) = c$. $\phi$ is then an antiisomorphism between A and B.

== Ring anti-isomorphisms ==
Specializing the general language of category theory to the algebraic topic of rings, we have: Let R and S be rings and f: R → S be a bijection. Then f is a ring anti-isomorphism if

$$f(x +_R y) = f(x) +_S f(y) \ \ \ \text{and} \ \ \ f(x \cdot_R y) = f(y) \cdot_S f(x) \ \ \ \text{for all } x,y \in R.$$

If R = S then f is a ring anti-automorphism.

An example of a ring anti-automorphism is given by the conjugate mapping of quaternions:

$$x_0 + x_1 \mathbf{i} + x_2 \mathbf{j} + x_3 \mathbf{k} \ \ \mapsto \ \ x_0 - x_1 \mathbf{i} - x_2 \mathbf{j} - x_3 \mathbf{k}.$$
