= Bounded lattice =

In mathematics, and in particular in order theory, a bounded lattice is a lattice that has a least element and a greatest element, usually denoted by $0$ and $1$, respectively.

Bounded lattices are of considerable importance because many algebraic structures are bounded lattices, including complete lattices, Heyting algebras, Boolean algebras, and others.

== Definition ==
A bounded lattice can be defined in two equivalent ways: via an order relation or algebraically. These two definitions can be shown to be equivalent.

=== Order-theoretic definition ===
Let $(L,\le)$ be a partially ordered set. Then $L$ is called a bounded lattice if and only if:

1. $L$ is a lattice with respect to the order relation:
  1. For every pair $a,b\in L$, there exists an infimum.
  2. For every pair $a,b\in L$, there exists a supremum.
2. $L$ is a bounded poset:
  1. There exists $m\in L$ such that for every $a\in L$, $m\le a$. This element is unique and is denoted by $0$.
  2. There exists $M\in L$ such that for every $a\in L$, $a\le M$. This element is unique and is denoted by $1$.

=== Algebraic definition ===
Let $L$ be a set equipped with two binary operations $\and$ and $\or$, and two distinguished elements $0,1\in L$. Then $L$ is called a bounded lattice if and only if the following conditions hold:

1. $L$ is a lattice with respect to $\and$ and $\or$:
  1. Associativity: for all $a,b,c\in L$, $(a\and b)\and c = a\and (b\and c)$ and $(a\or b)\or c = a\or (b\or c)$.
  2. Commutativity: for all $a,b\in L$, $a\and b = b\and a$ and $a\or b = b\or a$.
  3. Idempotence: for all $a\in L$, $a\and a = a$ and $a\or a = a$.
  4. Absorption: for all $a,b\in L$, $a\and (a\or b) = a$ and $a\or (a\and b) = a$.
2. $0$ and $1$ are identity elements for $\or$ and $\and$, respectively:
  1. For all $a\in L$, $a\or 0 = a$.
  2. For all $a\in L$, $a\and 1 = a$.

== Properties ==
- In a bounded lattice $(L,\and,\or,0,1)$, for every $a\in L$, one has $a\and 0 = 0$.
- In a bounded lattice $(L,\and,\or,0,1)$, for every $a\in L$, one has $a\or 1 = 1$.

== Bounding a lattice ==
Let $(L,\le)$ be an arbitrary lattice. One may ask whether there exists a bounded lattice $L'$ into which $L$ can be order-embedded.

Define $L' := \{\downarrow\!x \mid x\in L\}\cup\{\emptyset, L\}$, a collection of subsets of $L$, where for each $x\in L$, $\downarrow\!x$ denotes the principal lower set generated by $x$. It can be shown that $L'$, ordered by inclusion $\subseteq$, is a bounded lattice. Define a function $\varphi\colon L\to L'$ by $\varphi(x):=\downarrow\!x$. One can prove that $\varphi$ is an order embedding.

The Dedekind–MacNeille completion proves a much stronger statement: every partially ordered set (not necessarily a lattice) can be embedded into a complete lattice (which is necessarily bounded).

== Complemented lattice ==
Let $(L,\and,\or,0,1)$ be a bounded lattice. It is called a complemented lattice if and only if for every $a\in L$ there exists $b\in L$ such that $a\and b = 0$ and $a\or b = 1$.

In this case, $b$ is called a complement of $a$. In contrast to a Boolean algebra, a complemented lattice may have more than one complement for a given element. Intuitively, a complement can be thought of as a negation of the element.

== Examples ==
- Every finite partially ordered set that is a lattice is a complete lattice, and hence a bounded lattice.
- Every closed interval in the real line is a bounded lattice.
- Let $L$ be the collection of all vector subspaces of $\mathbb{R}^2$, ordered by inclusion. This is a bounded lattice with minimum ${0}$ and maximum $\mathbb{R}^2$.
- Let $C$ be the set of all continuous functions from $\mathbb{R}$ to the closed interval $[0,1]$, ordered pointwise: $f\le g$ if and only if $f(x)\le g(x)$ for all $x\in\mathbb{R}$. Then $(C,\le)$ is a lattice, since for any two functions one may take their pointwise minimum and maximum, which are again continuous. However, for an infinite family of continuous functions, this construction need not yield a continuous function. Hence, this lattice is not complete. It is bounded, since the constant functions $m(x):=0$ and $M(x):=1$ serve as global minimum and maximum.
- Let $P$ be the collection of all convex and closed polygons in $\mathbb{R}^2$, together with the empty set $\emptyset$ and the whole space $\mathbb{R}^2$, ordered by inclusion. This is a lattice because the intersection of two closed convex polygons is again a closed convex polygon, and the closure of the convex hull of their union is also a closed convex polygon. It is bounded, with $\emptyset$ as minimum and $\mathbb{R}^2$ as maximum. However, it is not complete: the family of all closed convex polygons contained in the unit disk has no supremum in this lattice, since their union is a circle, which is not a polygon.
