= Continuous poset =

Partially ordered set

In order theory, a continuous poset is a partially ordered set in which every element is the directed supremum of elements approximating it.

== Definitions ==
Let $a,b\in P$ be two elements of a preordered set $(P,\lesssim)$. Then we say that $a$ approximates $b$, or that $a$ is way-below $b$, if the following two equivalent conditions are satisfied.

- For any directed set $D\subseteq P$ such that $b\lesssim\sup D$, there is a $d\in D$ such that $a\lesssim d$.
- For any ideal $I\subseteq P$ such that $b\lesssim\sup I$, $a\in I$.

If $a$ approximates $b$, we write $a\ll b$. The approximation relation $\ll$ is a transitive relation that is weaker than the original order, also antisymmetric if $P$ is a partially ordered set, but not necessarily a preorder. It is a preorder if and only if $(P,\lesssim)$ satisfies the ascending chain condition.

For any $a\in P$, let

$$\mathop\Uparrow a=\{b\in L\mid a\ll b\}$$
$$\mathop\Downarrow a=\{b\in L\mid b\ll a\}$$

Then $\mathop\Uparrow a$ is an upper set, and $\mathop\Downarrow a$ a lower set. If $P$ is an upper-semilattice, $\mathop\Downarrow a$ is a directed set (that is, $b,c\ll a$ implies $b\vee c\ll a$), and therefore an ideal.

A preordered set $(P,\lesssim)$ is called a continuous preordered set if for any $a\in P$, the subset $\mathop\Downarrow a$ is directed and $a=\sup\mathop\Downarrow a$.

== Properties ==
=== The interpolation property ===
For any two elements $a,b\in P$ of a continuous preordered set $(P,\lesssim)$, $a\ll b$ if and only if for any directed set $D\subseteq P$ such that $b\lesssim\sup D$, there is a $d\in D$ such that $a\ll d$. From this follows the interpolation property of the continuous preordered set $(P,\lesssim)$: for any $a,b\in P$ such that $a\ll b$ there is a $c\in P$ such that $a\ll c\ll b$.

=== Continuous dcpos ===
For any two elements $a,b\in P$ of a continuous dcpo $(P,\le)$, the following two conditions are equivalent.

- $a\ll b$ and $a\ne b$.
- For any directed set $D\subseteq P$ such that $b\le\sup D$, there is a $d\in D$ such that $a\ll d$ and $a\ne d$.

Using this it can be shown that the following stronger interpolation property is true for continuous dcpos. For any $a,b\in P$ such that $a\ll b$ and $a\ne b$, there is a $c\in P$ such that $a\ll c\ll b$ and $a\ne c$.

For a dcpo $(P,\le)$, the following conditions are equivalent.

- $P$ is continuous.
- The supremum map $\sup \colon \operatorname{Ideal}(P)\to P$ from the partially ordered set of ideals of $P$ to $P$ has a left adjoint.

In this case, the actual left adjoint is

$${\Downarrow} \colon P\to\operatorname{Ideal}(P)$$
$$\mathord\Downarrow\dashv\sup$$

=== Continuous complete lattices ===
For any two elements $a,b\in L$ of a complete lattice $L$, $a\ll b$ if and only if for any subset $A\subseteq L$ such that $b\le\sup A$, there is a finite subset $F\subseteq A$ such that $a\le\sup F$.

Let $L$ be a complete lattice. Then the following conditions are equivalent.

- $L$ is continuous.
- The supremum map $\sup \colon \operatorname{Ideal}(L)\to L$ from the complete lattice of ideals of $L$ to $L$ preserves arbitrary infima.
- For any family $\mathcal D$ of directed sets of $L$, $\textstyle\inf_{D\in\mathcal D}\sup D=\sup_{f\in\prod\mathcal D}\inf_{D\in\mathcal D}f(D)$.
- $L$ is isomorphic to the image of a Scott-continuous idempotent map $r \colon \{0,1\}^\kappa\to\{0,1\}^\kappa$ on the direct power of arbitrarily many two-point lattices $\{0,1\}$.

A continuous complete lattice is often called a continuous lattice.

== Examples ==
=== Lattices of open sets ===
For a topological space $X$, the following conditions are equivalent.

- The complete Heyting algebra $\operatorname{Open}(X)$ of open sets of $X$ is a continuous complete Heyting algebra.
- The sobrification of $X$ is a locally compact space (in the sense that every point has a compact local base)
- $X$ is an exponentiable object in the category $\operatorname{Top}$ of topological spaces. That is, the functor $(-)\times X\colon\operatorname{Top}\to\operatorname{Top}$ has a right adjoint.
