= Completely distributive lattice =

In the mathematical area of order theory, a completely distributive lattice is a complete lattice in which arbitrary joins distribute over arbitrary meets.

Formally, a complete lattice L is said to be completely distributive if, for any doubly indexed family {x_{j,k} | j in J, k in K_{j}} of L, we have

$$\bigwedge_{j\in J}\bigvee_{k\in K_j} x_{j,k} =
\bigvee_{f\in F}\bigwedge_{j\in J} x_{j,f(j)}$$

where F is the set of choice functions f choosing for each index j of J some index f(j) in K_{j}.

Complete distributivity is a self-dual property, i.e. dualizing the above statement yields the same class of complete lattices.

== Alternative characterizations ==
Various different characterizations exist. For example, the following is an equivalent law that avoids the use of choice functions. For any set S of sets, we define the set S^{#} to be the set of all subsets X of the complete lattice that have non-empty intersection with all members of S. We then can define complete distributivity via the statement

$$\begin{align}\bigwedge \{ \bigvee Y \mid Y\in S\} = \bigvee\{ \bigwedge Z \mid Z\in S^\# \}\end{align}$$

The operator ( )^{#} might be called the crosscut operator. This version of complete distributivity only implies the original notion when admitting the Axiom of Choice.

== Properties ==
In addition, it is known that the following statements are equivalent for any complete lattice L:

- L is completely distributive.
- L can be embedded into a direct product of chains [0,1] by an order embedding that preserves arbitrary meets and joins.
- Both L and its dual order L^{op} are distributive continuous posets.

Direct products of [0,1], i.e. sets of all functions from some set X to [0,1] ordered pointwise, are also called cubes.

== Free completely distributive lattices ==
Every poset C can be completed in a completely distributive lattice.

A completely distributive lattice L is called the free completely distributive lattice over a poset C if and only if there is an order embedding $\phi:C\rightarrow L$ such that for every completely distributive lattice M and monotonic function $f:C\rightarrow M$, there is a unique complete homomorphism $f^*_\phi:L\rightarrow M$ satisfying $f=f^*_\phi\circ\phi$. For every poset C, the free completely distributive lattice over a poset C exists and is unique up to isomorphism.

This is an instance of the concept of free object. Since a set X can be considered as a poset with the discrete order, the above result guarantees the existence of the free completely distributive lattice over the set X.

== Examples ==
- The unit interval [0,1], ordered in the natural way, is a completely distributive lattice.
  - More generally, any complete chain is a completely distributive lattice.
- The power set lattice $(\mathcal{P}(X),\subseteq)$ for any set X is a completely distributive lattice.
- For every poset C, there is a free completely distributive lattice over C. See the section on Free completely distributive lattices above.

== See also ==
- Glossary of order theory
- Distributive lattice
