= Completeness (order theory) =

Existence of certain infima or suprema of a given poset

In the mathematical area of order theory, completeness properties assert the existence of certain infima or suprema of a given partially ordered set (poset). The most familiar example is the completeness of the real numbers. A special use of the term refers to complete partial orders or complete lattices. However, many other interesting notions of completeness exist.

The motivation for considering completeness properties derives from the great importance of suprema (least upper bounds, joins, "$\vee$") and infima (greatest lower bounds, meets, "$\wedge$") to the theory of partial orders. Finding a supremum means to single out one distinguished least element from the set of upper bounds. On the one hand, these special elements often embody certain concrete properties that are interesting for the given application (such as being the least common multiple of a set of numbers or the union of a collection of sets). On the other hand, the knowledge that certain types of subsets are guaranteed to have suprema or infima enables us to consider the evaluation of these elements as total operations on a partially ordered set. For this reason, posets with certain completeness properties can often be described as algebraic structures of a certain kind. In addition, studying the properties of the newly obtained operations yields further interesting subjects.

== Types of completeness properties ==
All completeness properties are described along a similar scheme: one describes a certain class of subsets of a partially ordered set that are required to have a supremum or required to have an infimum. Hence every completeness property has its dual, obtained by inverting the order-dependent definitions in the given statement. Some of the notions are usually not dualized while others may be self-dual (i.e. equivalent to their dual statements).

=== Least and greatest elements ===
The easiest example of a supremum is the empty one, i.e. the supremum of the empty set. By definition, this is the least element among all elements that are greater than each member of the empty set. But this is just the least element of the whole poset, if it has one, since the empty subset of a poset P is conventionally considered to be both bounded from above and from below, with every element of P being both an upper and lower bound of the empty subset. Other common names for the least element are bottom and zero (0). The dual notion, the empty lower bound, is the greatest element, top, or unit (1).

Posets that have a bottom are sometimes called pointed, while posets with a top are called unital or topped. An order that has both a least and a greatest element is bounded. However, this should not be confused with the notion of bounded completeness given below.

=== Finite completeness ===
Further simple completeness conditions arise from the consideration of all non-empty finite sets. An order in which all non-empty finite sets have both a supremum and an infimum is called a lattice. It suffices to require that all suprema and infima of two elements exist to obtain all non-empty finite ones; a straightforward induction argument shows that every finite non-empty supremum/infimum can be decomposed into a finite number of binary suprema/infima. Thus the central operations of lattices are binary suprema $\vee$ and infima $\wedge$. It is in this context that the terms meet for $\wedge$ and join for $\vee$ are most common.

A poset in which only non-empty finite suprema are known to exist is therefore called a join-semilattice. The dual notion is meet-semilattice.

=== Further completeness conditions ===
The strongest form of completeness is the existence of all suprema and all infima. The posets with this property are the complete lattices. However, using the given order, one can restrict to further classes of (possibly infinite) subsets, that do not yield this strong completeness at once.

If all directed subsets of a poset have a supremum, then the order is a directed-complete partial order (dcpo). These are especially important in domain theory. The seldom-considered dual notion to a dcpo is the filtered-complete poset. Dcpos with a least element ("pointed dcpos") are one of the possible meanings of the phrase complete partial order (cpo).

If every nonempty subset that has some upper bound has a least upper bound, the poset is called a conditionally complete lattice; if every bounded-above (potentially empty) subset has a least upper bound, it is called bounded complete. This is equivalent to the condition that the conditionally complete lattice has a least element if it is nonempty. The term "bounded complete" is used widely with this definition that focuses on suprema and there is no common name for the dual property. However, bounded completeness can be expressed in terms of other completeness conditions that are easily dualized (see below). Although concepts with the names "complete" and "bounded" were already defined, confusion is unlikely to occur since one would rarely speak of a "bounded complete poset" when meaning a "bounded cpo" (which is just a "cpo with greatest element"). Likewise, "bounded complete lattice" is almost unambiguous, since one would not state the boundedness property for complete lattices, where it is implied anyway.

One may also consider the subsets of a poset which are totally ordered, i.e. the chains. If all chains have a supremum, the order is called chain complete. Again, this concept is rarely needed in the dual form.

== Relationships between completeness properties ==
It was already observed that binary meets/joins yield all non-empty finite meets/joins. Likewise, many other (combinations) of the above conditions are equivalent.

- The best-known example is the existence of all suprema, which is in fact equivalent to the existence of all infima. Indeed, for any subset X of a poset, one can consider its set of lower bounds B. The supremum of B is then equal to the infimum of X: since each element of X is an upper bound of B, sup B is smaller than all elements of X, i.e. sup B is in B. It is the greatest element of B and hence the infimum of X. In a dual way, the existence of all infima implies the existence of all suprema.
- Bounded completeness can also be characterized differently. By an argument similar to the above, one finds that the supremum of a set with upper bounds is the infimum of the set of upper bounds. Consequently, bounded completeness is equivalent to the existence of all non-empty infima.
- A poset is a complete lattice if and only if it is a cpo and a join-semilattice. Indeed, for any subset X, the set of all finite suprema (joins) of X is directed and the supremum of this set (which exists by directed completeness) is equal to the supremum of X. Thus every set has a supremum and by the above observation we have a complete lattice. The other direction of the proof is trivial.
- Assuming the axiom of choice, a poset is chain complete if and only if it is a dcpo.

== Completeness in terms of universal algebra ==
As explained above, the presence of certain completeness conditions allows to regard the formation of certain suprema and infima as total operations of a partially ordered set. It turns out that in many cases it is possible to characterize completeness solely by considering appropriate algebraic structures in the sense of universal algebra, which are equipped with operations like $\vee$ or $\wedge$. By imposing additional conditions (in form of suitable identities) on these operations, one can then indeed derive the underlying partial order exclusively from such algebraic structures. Details on this characterization can be found in the articles on the "lattice-like" structures for which this is typically considered: see semilattice, lattice, Heyting algebra, and Boolean algebra. Note that the latter two structures extend the application of these principles beyond mere completeness requirements by introducing an additional operation of negation.

== Completeness in terms of adjunctions ==
Another interesting way to characterize completeness properties is provided through the concept of (monotone) Galois connections, i.e. adjunctions between partial orders. In fact this approach offers additional insights both into the nature of many completeness properties and into the importance of Galois connections for order theory. The general observation on which this reformulation of completeness is based is that the construction of certain suprema or infima provides left or right adjoint parts of suitable Galois connections.

Consider a partially ordered set (X, ≤). As a first simple example, let 1 = {*} be a specified one-element set with the only possible partial ordering. There is an obvious mapping j: X → 1 with j(x) = * for all x in X. X has a least element if and only if the function j has a lower adjoint j^{*}: 1 → X. Indeed the definition for Galois connections yields that in this case j^{*}(*) ≤ x if and only if * ≤ j(x), where the right hand side obviously holds for any x. Dually, the existence of an upper adjoint for j is equivalent to X having a greatest element.

Another simple mapping is the function q: X → X × X given by q(x) = (x, x). Naturally, the intended ordering relation for X × X is just the usual product order. q has a lower adjoint q^{*} if and only if all binary joins in X exist. Conversely, the join operation $\vee$: X × X → X can always provide the (necessarily unique) lower adjoint for q. Dually, q allows for an upper adjoint if and only if X has all binary meets. Thus the meet operation $\wedge$, if it exists, always is an upper adjoint. If both $\vee$ and $\wedge$ exist and, in addition, $\wedge$ is also a lower adjoint, then the poset X is a Heyting algebra—another important special class of partial orders.

Further completeness statements can be obtained by exploiting suitable completion procedures. For example, it is well known that the collection of all lower sets of a poset X, ordered by subset inclusion, yields a complete lattice D(X) (the downset-lattice). Furthermore, there is an obvious embedding e: X → D(X) that maps each element x of X to its principal ideal {y in X | y ≤ x}. A little reflection now shows that e has a lower adjoint if and only if X is a complete lattice. In fact, this lower adjoint will map any lower set of X to its supremum in X. Composing this lower adjoint with the function that maps any subset of X to its lower closure (again an adjunction for the inclusion of lower sets in the powerset), one obtains the usual supremum map from the powerset 2^{X} to X. As before, another important situation occurs whenever this supremum map is also an upper adjoint: in this case the complete lattice X is constructively completely distributive. See also the articles on complete distributivity and distributivity (order theory).

The considerations in this section suggest a reformulation of (parts of) order theory in terms of category theory, where properties are usually expressed by referring to the relationships (morphisms, more specifically: adjunctions) between objects, instead of considering their internal structure. For more detailed considerations of this relationship see the article on the categorical formulation of order theory.

== See also ==
- Completely distributive lattice
- Total order – Order whose elements are all comparable
