= Finite completeness =

Finite completeness may refer to:

- Complete category, a category in which all finite limits exist
- Completeness (order theory)#Finite completeness, a condition for partially ordered sets
