= Complete Heyting algebra =

Algebraic structure

In mathematics, especially in order theory, a complete Heyting algebra is a Heyting algebra that is complete as a lattice. Complete Heyting algebras are the objects of three different categories; the category CHey, the category Loc of locales, and its opposite, the category Frm of frames. Although these three categories contain the same objects, they differ in their morphisms, and thus get distinct names. Only the morphisms of CHey are homomorphisms of complete Heyting algebras.

Locales and frames form the foundation of pointless topology, which, instead of building on point-set topology, recasts the ideas of general topology in categorical terms, as statements on frames and locales.

== Definition ==
Consider a partially ordered set (P, ≤) that is a complete lattice. Then P is a complete Heyting algebra or frame if any of the following equivalent conditions hold:

- P is a Heyting algebra, i.e. the operation $(x\land\cdot)$ has a right adjoint (also called the lower adjoint of a (monotone) Galois connection), for each element x of P.
- For all elements x of P and all subsets S of P, the following infinite distributivity law holds:

$$x \land  \bigvee_{s \in S} s = \bigvee_{s \in S} (x \land  s).$$

- P is a distributive lattice, i.e., for all x, y and z in P, we have

$$x \land  ( y \lor z ) = ( x \land  y ) \lor ( x \land  z )$$

and the meet operations $(x\land\cdot)$ are Scott continuous (i.e., preserve the suprema of directed sets) for all x in P.

The entailed definition of Heyting implication is $a\to b=\bigvee\{c \mid a\land c\le b\}.$

Using a bit more category theory, we can equivalently define a frame to be a cocomplete cartesian closed poset.

== Examples ==
The system of all open sets of a given topological space ordered by inclusion is a complete Heyting algebra.

== Frames and locales ==
The objects of the category CHey, the category Frm of frames and the category Loc of locales are complete Heyting algebras. These categories differ in what constitutes a morphism:

- The morphisms of Frm are (necessarily monotone) functions that preserve finite meets and arbitrary joins.
- The definition of Heyting algebras crucially involves the existence of right adjoints to the binary meet operation, which together define an additional implication operation. Thus, the morphisms of CHey are morphisms of frames that in addition preserve implication.
- The morphisms of Loc are opposite to those of Frm, and they are usually called maps (of locales).

The relation of locales and their maps to topological spaces and continuous functions may be seen as follows. Let $f: X\to Y$ be any map. The power sets P(X) and P(Y) are complete Boolean algebras, and the map $f^{-1}: P(Y)\to P(X)$ is a homomorphism of complete Boolean algebras. Suppose the spaces X and Y are topological spaces, endowed with the topology O(X) and O(Y) of open sets on X and Y. Note that O(X) and O(Y) are subframes of P(X) and P(Y). If $f$ is a continuous function, then $f^{-1}: O(Y)\to O(X)$ preserves finite meets and arbitrary joins of these subframes. This shows that O is a functor from the category Top of topological spaces to Loc, taking any continuous map

$$f: X\to Y$$

to the map

$$O(f): O(X)\to O(Y)$$

in Loc that is defined in Frm to be the inverse image frame homomorphism

$$f^{-1}: O(Y)\to O(X).$$

Given a map of locales $f: A\to B$ in Loc, it is common to write $f^*: B\to A$ for the frame homomorphism that defines it in Frm. Using this notation, $O(f)$ is defined by the equation $O(f)^* = f^{-1}.$

Conversely, any locale A has a topological space S(A), called its spectrum, that best approximates the locale. In addition, any map of locales $f: A\to B$ determines a continuous map $S(A)\to S(B).$ Moreover, this assignment is functorial: letting P(1) denote the locale that is obtained as the power set of the terminal set $1=\{*\},$ the points of S(A) are the maps $p: P(1)\to A$ in Loc, i.e., the frame homomorphisms $p^*: A\to P(1).$

For each $a\in A$ we define $U_a$ as the set of points $p\in S(A)$ such that $p^*(a) =\{*\}.$ It is easy to verify that this defines a frame homomorphism $A\to P(S(A)),$ whose image is therefore a topology on S(A). Then, if $f: A\to B$ is a map of locales, to each point $p\in S(A)$ we assign the point $S(f)(q)$ defined by letting $S(f)(p)^*$ be the composition of $p^*$ with $f^*,$ hence obtaining a continuous map $S(f): S(A)\to S(B).$ This defines a functor $S$ from Loc to Top, which is right adjoint to O.

Any locale that is isomorphic to the topology of its spectrum is called spatial, and any topological space that is homeomorphic to the spectrum of its locale of open sets is called sober. The adjunction between topological spaces and locales restricts to an equivalence of categories between sober spaces and spatial locales.

Any function that preserves all joins (and hence any frame homomorphism) has a right adjoint, and, conversely, any function that preserves all meets has a left adjoint. Hence, the category Loc is isomorphic to the category whose objects are the frames and whose morphisms are the meet preserving functions whose left adjoints preserve finite meets. This is often regarded as a representation of Loc, but it should not be confused with Loc itself, whose morphisms are formally the same as frame homomorphisms in the opposite direction.

== Literature ==
- P. T. Johnstone, Stone Spaces, Cambridge Studies in Advanced Mathematics 3, Cambridge University Press, Cambridge, 1982. (ISBN 0-521-23893-5)

Still a great resource on locales and complete Heyting algebras.

- G. Gierz, K. H. Hofmann, K. Keimel, J. D. Lawson, M. Mislove, and D. S. Scott, Continuous Lattices and Domains, In Encyclopedia of Mathematics and its Applications, Vol. 93, Cambridge University Press, 2003. ISBN 0-521-80338-1

Includes the characterization in terms of meet continuity.

- Francis Borceux: Handbook of Categorical Algebra III, volume 52 of Encyclopedia of Mathematics and its Applications. Cambridge University Press, 1994.

Surprisingly extensive resource on locales and Heyting algebras. Takes a more categorical viewpoint.

- Steven Vickers, Topology via logic, Cambridge University Press, 1989, ISBN 0-521-36062-5.
- Pedicchio, Maria Cristina; Tholen, Walter, eds. (2004). Categorical foundations. Special topics in order, topology, algebra, and sheaf theory. Encyclopedia of Mathematics and Its Applications. Vol. 97. Cambridge: Cambridge University Press. ISBN 0-521-83414-7. Zbl 1034.18001.
