= Distributivity (order theory) =

In the mathematical area of order theory, there are various notions of the common concept of distributivity, applied to the formation of suprema and infima. Most of these apply to partially ordered sets that are at least lattices, but the concept can in fact reasonably be generalized to semilattices as well.

== Distributive lattices ==
Probably the most common type of distributivity is the one defined for lattices, where the formation of binary suprema and infima provide the total operations of join ($\vee$) and meet ($\wedge$). Distributivity of these two operations is then expressed by requiring that the identity

$$x \wedge (y \vee z) = (x \wedge y) \vee (x \wedge z)$$

hold for all elements x, y, and z. This distributivity law defines the class of distributive lattices. Note that this requirement can be rephrased by saying that binary meets preserve binary joins. The above statement is known to be equivalent to its order dual

$$x \vee (y \wedge z) = (x \vee y) \wedge (x \vee z)$$

such that one of these properties suffices to define distributivity for lattices. Typical examples of distributive lattice are totally ordered sets, Boolean algebras, and Heyting algebras. Every finite distributive lattice is isomorphic to a lattice of sets, ordered by inclusion (Birkhoff's representation theorem).

== Distributivity for semilattices ==
Hasse diagram for the definition of distributivity for a meet-semilattice.

A semilattice is partially ordered set with only one of the two lattice operations, either a meet- or a join-semilattice. Given that there is only one binary operation, distributivity obviously cannot be defined in the standard way. Nevertheless, because of the interaction of the single operation with the given order, the following definition of distributivity remains possible. A meet-semilattice is distributive, if for all a, b, and x:

If a ∧ b ≤ x then there exist a′ and b′ such that a ≤ a′, b ≤ b' and x = a′ ∧ b' .

Distributive join-semilattices are defined dually: a join-semilattice is distributive, if for all a, b, and x:

If x ≤ a ∨ b then there exist a′ and b′ such that a′ ≤ a, b′ ≤ b and x = a′ ∨ b' .

In either case, a' and b' need not be unique. These definitions are justified by the fact that given any lattice L, the following statements are all equivalent:

- L is distributive as a meet-semilattice
- L is distributive as a join-semilattice
- L is a distributive lattice.

Thus any distributive meet-semilattice in which binary joins exist is a distributive lattice. A join-semilattice is distributive if and only if the lattice of its ideals (under inclusion) is distributive.

This definition of distributivity allows generalizing some statements about distributive lattices to distributive semilattices.

== Distributivity laws for complete lattices ==
For a complete lattice, arbitrary subsets have both infima and suprema and thus infinitary meet and join operations are available. Several extended notions of distributivity can thus be described. For example, for the infinite distributive law, finite meets may distribute over arbitrary joins, i.e.

$$x \wedge \bigvee S = \bigvee \{ x \wedge s \mid s \in S \}$$

may hold for all elements x and all subsets S of the lattice. Complete lattices with this property are called frames, locales or complete Heyting algebras. They arise in connection with pointless topology and Stone duality. This distributive law is not equivalent to its dual statement

$$x \vee \bigwedge S = \bigwedge \{ x \vee s \mid s \in S \}$$

which defines the class of dual frames or complete co-Heyting algebras.

Now one can go even further and define orders where arbitrary joins distribute over arbitrary meets. Such structures are called completely distributive lattices. However, expressing this requires formulations that are a little more technical. Consider a doubly indexed family {x_{j,k} | j in J, k in K(j)} of elements of a complete lattice, and let F be the set of choice functions f choosing for each index j of J some index f(j) in K(j). A complete lattice is completely distributive if for all such data the following statement holds:

$$\bigwedge_{j\in J}\bigvee_{k\in K(j)} x_{j,k} =
\bigvee_{f\in F}\bigwedge_{j\in J} x_{j,f(j)}$$

Complete distributivity is again a self-dual property, i.e. dualizing the above statement yields the same class of complete lattices. Completely distributive complete lattices (also called completely distributive lattices for short) are indeed highly special structures. See the article on completely distributive lattices.

== Distributive elements in arbitrary lattices ==
Pentagon lattice N_{5}

In an arbitrary lattice, an element x is called a distributive element if ∀y,z: x ∨ (y ∧ z) = (x ∨ y) ∧ (x ∨ z). An element x is called a dual distributive element if ∀y,z: x ∧ (y ∨ z) = (x ∧ y) ∨ (x ∧ z).

In a distributive lattice, every element is of course both distributive and dual distributive. In a non-distributive lattice, there may be elements that are distributive, but not dual distributive (and vice versa). For example, in the depicted pentagon lattice N_{5}, the element x is distributive, but not dual distributive, since x ∧ (y ∨ z) = x ∧ 1 = x ≠ z = 0 ∨ z = (x ∧ y) ∨ (x ∧ z).

In an arbitrary lattice L, the following are equivalent:

- x is a distributive element;
- The map φ defined by φ(y) = x ∨ y is a lattice homomorphism from L to the upper closure ↑x = { y ∈ L: x ≤ y };
- The binary relation Θ_{x} on L defined by y Θ_{x} z if x ∨ y = x ∨ z is a congruence relation, that is, an equivalence relation compatible with ∧ and ∨.

In an arbitrary lattice, if x_{1} and x_{2} are distributive elements, then so is x_{1} ∨ x_{2}.

== Literature ==
Distributivity is a basic concept that is treated in any textbook on lattice and order theory. See the literature given for the articles on order theory and lattice theory. More specific literature includes:

- G. N. Raney, Completely distributive complete lattices, Proceedings of the American Mathematical Society, 3: 677 - 680, 1952.
