= Extended natural numbers =

In mathematics, the extended natural numbers is a set which contains the values $0, 1, 2, \dots$ and $\infty$ (infinity). That is, it is the result of adding a maximum element $\infty$ to the natural numbers. Addition and multiplication work as normal for finite values, and are extended by the rules $n+\infty=\infty+n=\infty$ ($n\in\mathbb{N}\cup \{\infty\}$), $0\times \infty=\infty \times 0=0$ and $m\times \infty=\infty\times m=\infty$ for $m\neq 0$.

With addition and multiplication, $\mathbb{N}\cup \{\infty\}$ is a semiring but not a ring, as $\infty$ lacks an additive inverse. The set can be denoted by $\overline{\mathbb{N}}$, $\mathbb{N}_\infty$ or $\mathbb{N}^\infty$. It is a subset of the extended real number line, which extends the real numbers by adding $-\infty$ and $+\infty$.

== Applications ==
In graph theory, the extended natural numbers are used to define distances in graphs, with $\infty$ being the distance between two unconnected vertices. They can be used to show the extension of some results, such as the max-flow min-cut theorem, to infinite graphs.

In topology, the Grothendieck topos of right actions on the extended natural numbers is a category PRO of projection algebras.

In constructive mathematics, the extended natural numbers $\mathbb{N}_\infty$ are a one-point compactification of the natural numbers, yielding the set of non-increasing binary sequences i.e. $(x_0,x_1,\dots)\in 2^\mathbb{N}$ such that $\forall i\in\mathbb{N}: x_i\ge x_{i+1}$. The sequence $1^n 0^\omega$ represents $n$, while the sequence $1^\omega$ represents $\infty$. It is a retract of $2^\mathbb{N}$ and the claim that $\mathbb{N}\cup \{\infty\}\subseteq \mathbb{N}_\infty$ implies the limited principle of omniscience.
