= Greatest element and least element =

Concept in mathematics

Hasse diagram of the set $P$ of divisors of 60, partially ordered by the relation "$x$ divides $y$". The red subset $S = \{ 1, 2, 3, 5, 6, 10, 15, 30 \}$ has one greatest element, viz. 30, and one least element, viz. 1. These elements are also maximal and minimal elements, respectively, of the red subset.

In mathematics, especially in order theory, the greatest element of a subset $S$ of a partially ordered set (poset) is an element of $S$ that is greater than every other element of $S$. The term least element is defined dually, that is, it is an element of $S$ that is smaller than every other element of $S.$

== Definitions ==
Let $(P, \leq)$ be a preordered set and let $S \subseteq P.$ An element $g \in P$ is said to be a greatest element of $S$ if $g \in S$ and if it also satisfies:

$s \leq g$ for all $s \in S.$

By switching the side of the relation that $s$ is on in the above definition, the definition of a least element of $S$ is obtained. Explicitly, an element $l \in P$ is said to be a least element of $S$ if $l \in S$ and if it also satisfies:

$l \leq s$ for all $s \in S.$

If $(P, \leq)$ is also a partially ordered set then $S$ can have at most one greatest element and it can have at most one least element. Whenever a greatest element of $S$ exists and is unique then this element is called the greatest element of $S$. The terminology the least element of $S$ is defined similarly.

If $(P, \leq)$ has a greatest element (resp. a least element) then this element is also called a top (resp. a bottom) of $(P, \leq).$

=== Relationship to upper/lower bounds ===
Greatest elements are closely related to upper bounds.

Let $(P, \leq)$ be a preordered set and let $S \subseteq P.$ An upper bound of $S$ in $(P, \leq)$ is an element $u$ such that $u \in P$ and $s \leq u$ for all $s \in S.$ Importantly, an upper bound of $S$ in $P$ is not required to be an element of $S.$

If $g \in P$ then $g$ is a greatest element of $S$ if and only if $g$ is an upper bound of $S$ in $(P, \leq)$ and $g \in S.$ In particular, any greatest element of $S$ is also an upper bound of $S$ (in $P$) but an upper bound of $S$ in $P$ is a greatest element of $S$ if and only if it belongs to $S.$ In the particular case where $P = S,$ the definition of "$u$ is an upper bound of $S$ in $S$" becomes: $u$ is an element such that $u \in S$ and $s \leq u$ for all $s \in S,$ which is completely identical to the definition of a greatest element given before. Thus $g$ is a greatest element of $S$ if and only if $g$ is an upper bound of $S$ in $S$.

If $u$ is an upper bound of $S$ in $P$ that is not an upper bound of $S$ in $S$ (which can happen if and only if $u \not\in S$) then $u$ can not be a greatest element of $S$ (however, it may be possible that some other element is a greatest element of $S$). In particular, it is possible for $S$ to simultaneously not have a greatest element and for there to exist some upper bound of $S$ in $P$.

Even if a set has some upper bounds, it need not have a greatest element, as shown by the example of the negative real numbers. This example also demonstrates that the existence of a least upper bound (the number 0 in this case) does not imply the existence of a greatest element either.

=== Contrast to maximal elements and local/absolute maximums ===
In the above divisibility order, the red subset $S = \{ 1, 2, 3, 4 \}$ has two maximal elements, viz. 3 and 4, none of which is greatest. It has one minimal element, viz. 1, which is also its least element.

A greatest element of a subset of a preordered set should not be confused with a maximal element of the set, which are elements that are not strictly smaller than any other element in the set.

Let $(P, \leq)$ be a preordered set and let $S \subseteq P.$ An element $m \in S$ is said to be a maximal element of $S$ if the following condition is satisfied:

whenever $s \in S$ satisfies $m \leq s,$ then necessarily $s \leq m.$

If $(P, \leq)$ is a partially ordered set then $m \in S$ is a maximal element of $S$ if and only if there does not exist any $s \in S$ such that $m \leq s$ and $s \neq m.$ A maximal element of $(P, \leq)$ is defined to mean a maximal element of the subset $S := P.$

A set can have several maximal elements without having a greatest element. Like upper bounds and maximal elements, greatest elements may fail to exist.

In a totally ordered set the maximal element and the greatest element coincide; and it is also called maximum; in the case of function values it is also called the absolute maximum, to avoid confusion with a local maximum. The dual terms are minimum and absolute minimum. Together they are called the absolute extrema. Similar conclusions hold for least elements.

Role of (in)comparability in distinguishing greatest vs. maximal elements

One of the most important differences between a greatest element $g$ and a maximal element $m$ of a preordered set $(P, \leq)$ has to do with what elements they are comparable to. Two elements $x, y \in P$ are said to be comparable if $x \leq y$ or $y \leq x$; they are called incomparable if they are not comparable. Because preorders are reflexive (which means that $x \leq x$ is true for all elements $x$), every element $x$ is always comparable to itself. Consequently, the only pairs of elements that could possibly be incomparable are distinct pairs. In general, however, preordered sets (and even directed partially ordered sets) may have elements that are incomparable.

By definition, an element $g \in P$ is a greatest element of $(P, \leq)$ if $s \leq g,$ for every $s \in P$; so by its very definition, a greatest element of $(P, \leq)$ must, in particular, be comparable to every element in $P.$ This is not required of maximal elements. Maximal elements of $(P, \leq)$ are not required to be comparable to every element in $P.$ This is because unlike the definition of "greatest element", the definition of "maximal element" includes an important if statement. The defining condition for $m \in P$ to be a maximal element of $(P, \leq)$ can be reworded as:

For all $s \in P,$ IF $m \leq s$ (so elements that are incomparable to $m$ are ignored) then $s \leq m.$

Example where all elements are maximal but none are greatest

Suppose that $S$ is a set containing at least two (distinct) elements and define a partial order $\,\leq\,$ on $S$ by declaring that $i \leq j$ if and only if $i = j.$ If $i \neq j$ belong to $S$ then neither $i \leq j$ nor $j \leq i$ holds, which shows that all pairs of distinct (i.e. non-equal) elements in $S$ are incomparable. Consequently, $(S, \leq)$ can not possibly have a greatest element (because a greatest element of $S$ would, in particular, have to be comparable to every element of $S$ but $S$ has no such element). However, every element $m \in S$ is a maximal element of $(S, \leq)$ because there is exactly one element in $S$ that is both comparable to $m$ and $\geq m,$ that element being $m$ itself (which of course, is $\leq m$). (Note: Of course, in this particular example, there exists only one element in $S$ that is comparable to $m,$ which is necessarily $m$ itself, so the second condition "and $\geq m,$" was redundant.)

In contrast, if a preordered set $(P, \leq)$ does happen to have a greatest element $g$ then $g$ will necessarily be a maximal element of $(P, \leq)$ and moreover, as a consequence of the greatest element $g$ being comparable to every element of $P,$ if $(P, \leq)$ is also partially ordered then it is possible to conclude that $g$ is the only maximal element of $(P, \leq).$ However, the uniqueness conclusion is no longer guaranteed if the preordered set $(P, \leq)$ is not also partially ordered. For example, suppose that $R$ is a non-empty set and define a preorder $\,\leq\,$ on $R$ by declaring that $i \leq j$ always holds for all $i, j \in R.$ The directed preordered set $(R, \leq)$ is partially ordered if and only if $R$ has exactly one element. All pairs of elements from $R$ are comparable and every element of $R$ is a greatest element (and thus also a maximal element) of $(R, \leq).$ So in particular, if $R$ has at least two elements then $(R, \leq)$ has multiple distinct greatest elements.

== Properties ==
Throughout, let $(P, \leq)$ be a partially ordered set and let $S \subseteq P.$

- A set $S$ can have at most one greatest element. (Note: If $g_1$ and $g_2$ are both greatest, then $g_1 \leq g_2$ and $g_2 \leq g_1,$ and hence $g_1 = g_2$ by antisymmetry.) Thus if a set has a greatest element then it is necessarily unique.
- If it exists, then the greatest element of $S$ is an upper bound of $S$ that is also contained in $S.$
- If $g$ is the greatest element of $S$ then $g$ is also a maximal element of $S$ (Note: If $g$ is the greatest element of $S$ and $s \in S,$ then $s \leq g.$ By antisymmetry, this renders ($g \leq s$ and $g \neq s$) impossible.) and moreover, any other maximal element of $S$ will necessarily be equal to $g.$ (Note: If $M$ is a maximal element, then $M \leq g$ since $g$ is greatest, hence $M = g$ since $M$ is maximal.)
  - Thus if a set $S$ has several maximal elements then it cannot have a greatest element.
- If $P$ satisfies the ascending chain condition, a subset $S$ of $P$ has a greatest element if, and only if, it has one maximal element. (Note: Only if: see above. — If: Assume for contradiction that $S$ has just one maximal element, $m,$ but no greatest element. Since $m$ is not greatest, some $s_1 \in S$ must exist that is incomparable to $m.$ Hence $s_1 \in S$ cannot be maximal, that is, $s_1 < s_2$ must hold for some $s_2 \in S.$ The latter must be incomparable to $m,$ too, since $m < s_2$ contradicts $m$'s maximality while $s_2 \leq m$ contradicts the incomparability of $m$ and $s_1.$ Repeating this argument, an infinite ascending chain $s_1 < s_2 < \cdots < s_n < \cdots$ can be found (such that each $s_i$ is incomparable to $m$ and not maximal). This contradicts the ascending chain condition.)
- When the restriction of $\,\leq\,$ to $S$ is a total order ($S = \{ 1, 2, 4 \}$ in the topmost picture is an example), then the notions of maximal element and greatest element coincide. (Note: Let $m \in S$ be a maximal element, for any $s \in S$ either $s \leq m$ or $m \leq s.$ In the second case, the definition of maximal element requires that $m = s,$ so it follows that $s \leq m.$ In other words, $m$ is a greatest element.)
  - However, this is not a necessary condition for whenever $S$ has a greatest element, the notions coincide, too, as stated above.
- If the notions of maximal element and greatest element coincide on every two-element subset $S$ of $P,$ then $\,\leq\,$ is a total order on $P.$ (Note: If $a, b \in P$ were incomparable, then $S = \{ a, b \}$ would have two maximal, but no greatest element, contradicting the coincidence.)

== Sufficient conditions ==
- A finite chain always has a greatest and a least element.

== Top and bottom ==
The least and greatest element of the whole partially ordered set play a special role and are also called bottom (⊥) and top (⊤), or zero (0) and unit (1), respectively. If both exist, the poset is called a bounded poset. The notation of 0 and 1 is used preferably when the poset is a complemented lattice, and when no confusion is likely, i.e. when one is not talking about partial orders of numbers that already contain elements 0 and 1 different from bottom and top. The existence of least and greatest elements is a special completeness property of a partial order.

Further introductory information is found in the article on order theory.

== Examples ==
Hasse diagram of example 2

- The subset of integers has no upper bound in the set $\mathbb{R}$ of real numbers.
- Let the relation $\,\leq\,$ on $\{ a, b, c, d \}$ be given by $a \leq c,$ $a \leq d,$ $b \leq c,$ $b \leq d.$ The set $\{ a, b \}$ has upper bounds $c$ and $d,$ but no least upper bound, and no greatest element (cf. picture).
- In the rational numbers, the set of numbers with their square less than 2 has upper bounds but no greatest element and no least upper bound.
- In $\mathbb{R},$ the set of numbers less than 1 has a least upper bound, viz. 1, but no greatest element.
- In $\mathbb{R},$ the set of numbers less than or equal to 1 has a greatest element, viz. 1, which is also its least upper bound.
- In $\mathbb{R}^2$ with the product order, the set of pairs $(x, y)$ with $0 < x < 1$ has no upper bound.
- In $\mathbb{R}^2$ with the lexicographical order, this set has upper bounds, e.g. $(1, 0).$ It has no least upper bound.

== See also ==
- Essential supremum and essential infimum
- Initial and terminal objects
- Maximal and minimal elements
- Limit superior and limit inferior (infimum limit)
- Upper and lower bounds
- Well-order — a non-strict order such that every non-empty set has a least element
