= Duality (order theory) =

Term in the mathematical area of order theory

In the mathematical area of order theory, every partially ordered set P gives rise to a dual (or opposite) partially ordered set which is often denoted by P^{op} or P^{d}. This dual order P^{op} is defined to be the same set, but with the inverse order, i.e. x ≤ y holds in P^{op} if and only if y ≤ x holds in P. It is easy to see that this construction, which can be depicted by flipping the Hasse diagram for P upside down, will indeed yield a partially ordered set. In a broader sense, two partially ordered sets are also said to be duals if they are dually isomorphic, i.e. if one poset is order isomorphic to the dual of the other.

The importance of this simple definition stems from the fact that every definition and theorem of order theory can readily be transferred to the dual order. Formally, this is captured by the Duality Principle for ordered sets:

If a given statement is valid for all partially ordered sets, then its dual statement, obtained by inverting the direction of all order relations and by dualizing all order theoretic definitions involved, is also valid for all partially ordered sets.

If a statement or definition is equivalent to its dual then it is said to be self-dual. Note that the consideration of dual orders is so fundamental that it often occurs implicitly when writing ≥ for the dual order of ≤ without giving any prior definition of this "new" symbol.

== Examples ==
A bounded distributive lattice, and its dual

Naturally, there are a great number of examples for concepts that are dual:

- Greatest elements and least elements
- Maximal elements and minimal elements
- Least upper bounds (suprema, ∨) and greatest lower bounds (infima, ∧)
- Upper sets and lower sets
- Ideals and filters
- Closure operators and kernel operators.

Examples of notions which are self-dual include:

- Being a (complete) lattice
- Monotonicity of functions
- Distributivity of lattices, i.e. the lattices for which ∀x,y,z: x ∧ (y ∨ z) = (x ∧ y) ∨ (x ∧ z) holds are exactly those for which the dual statement ∀x,y,z: x ∨ (y ∧ z) = (x ∨ y) ∧ (x ∨ z) holds
- Being a Boolean algebra
- Being an order isomorphism.

Since partial orders are antisymmetric, the only ones that are self-dual are the equivalence relations (but the notion of partial order is self-dual).

== See also ==
- Converse relation
- List of Boolean algebra topics
- Transpose graph
- Duality in category theory, of which duality in order theory is a special case
