= Introduction to Lattices and Order =

1990 book on mathematical order theory

- Title page for Introduction to Lattices and Order (1990)
- Author: Brian A. Davey; Hilary Priestley
- Language: English
- Series: Cambridge Mathematical Textbooks
- Subject: Order theory
- Genre: Mathematics
- Publisher: Cambridge University Press
- Publication date: 1990

Introduction to Lattices and Order is a mathematical textbook on order theory by Brian A. Davey and Hilary Priestley. It was published by the Cambridge University Press in their Cambridge Mathematical Textbooks series in 1990, with a second edition in 2002. The second edition is significantly different in its topics and organization, and was revised to incorporate recent developments in the area, especially in its applications to computer science. The Basic Library List Committee of the Mathematical Association of America has suggested its inclusion in undergraduate mathematics libraries.

== Topics ==
Both editions of the book have 11 chapters; in the second book they are organized with the first four providing a general reference for mathematicians and computer scientists, and the remaining seven focusing on more specialized material for logicians, topologists, and lattice theorists.

The first chapter concerns partially ordered sets, with a fundamental example given by the partial functions ordered by the subset relation on their graphs, and covers fundamental concepts including top and bottom elements and upper and lower sets. These ideas lead to the second chapter, on lattices, in which every two elements (or in complete lattices, every set) has a greatest lower bound and a least upper bound. This chapter includes the construction of a lattice from the lower sets of any partial order, and the Knaster–Tarski theorem constructing a lattice from the fixed points of an order-preserving functions on a complete lattice. Chapter three concerns formal concept analysis, its construction of "concept lattices" from collections of objects and their properties, with each lattice element representing both a set of objects and a set of properties held by those objects, and the universality of this construction in forming complete lattices. The fourth of the introductory chapters concerns special classes of lattices, including modular lattices, distributive lattices, and Boolean lattices.

In the second part of the book, chapter 5 concerns the theorem that every finite Boolean lattice is isomorphic to the lattice of subsets of a finite set, and (less trivially) Birkhoff's representation theorem according to which every finite distributive lattice is isomorphic to the lattice of lower sets of a finite partial order. Chapter 6 covers congruence relations on lattices. The topics in chapter 7 include closure operations and Galois connections on partial orders, and the Dedekind–MacNeille completion of a partial order into the smallest complete lattice containing it. The next two chapters concern complete partial orders, their fixed-point theorems, information systems, and their applications to denotational semantics. Chapter 10 discusses order-theoretic equivalents of the axiom of choice, including extensions of the representation theorems from chapter 5 to infinite lattices, and the final chapter discusses the representation of lattices with topological spaces, including Stone's representation theorem for Boolean algebras and the duality theory for distributive lattices.

Two appendices provide background in topology needed for the final chapter, and an annotated bibliography.

== Audience and reception ==
This book is aimed at beginning graduate students, although it could also be used by advanced undergraduates. Its many exercises make it suitable as a course textbook, and serve both to fill in details from the exposition in the book, and to provide pointers to additional topics. Although some mathematical sophistication is required of its readers, the main prerequisites are discrete mathematics, abstract algebra, and group theory.

Writing of the first edition, reviewer Josef Niederle calls it "an excellent textbook", "up-to-date and clear". Similarly, Thomas S. Blyth praises the first edition as "a well-written, satisfying, informative, and stimulating account of applications that are of great interest", and in an updated review writes that the second edition is as good as the first. Likewise, although Jon Cohen has some quibbles with the ordering and selection of topics (particularly the inclusion of congruences at the expense of a category-theoretic view of the subject), he concludes that the book is "a wonderful and accessible introduction to lattice theory, of equal interest to both computer scientists and mathematicians".

Both Blyth and Cohen note the book's skilled use of LaTeX to create its diagrams, and its helpful descriptions of how the diagrams were made.
