= Duality theory for distributive lattices =

In mathematics, duality theory for distributive lattices provides three different (but closely related) representations of bounded distributive lattices via Priestley spaces, spectral spaces, and pairwise Stone spaces. This duality, which is originally also due to Marshall H. Stone, generalizes the well-known Stone duality between Stone spaces and Boolean algebras.

Let L be a bounded distributive lattice, and let X denote the set of prime filters of L. For each a ∈ L, let φ_{+}(a) = {x∈ X : a ∈ x}. Then (X,τ_{+}) is a spectral space, where the topology τ_{+} on X is generated by {φ_{+}(a) : a ∈ L}. The spectral space (X, τ_{+}) is called the prime spectrum of L.

The map φ_{+} is a lattice isomorphism from L onto the lattice of all compact open subsets of (X,τ_{+}). In fact, each spectral space is homeomorphic to the prime spectrum of some bounded distributive lattice.

Similarly, if φ_{−}(a) = {x∈ X : a ∉ x} and τ_{−} denotes the topology generated by {φ_{−}(a) : a∈ L}, then (X,τ_{−}) is also a spectral space. Moreover, (X,τ_{+},τ_{−}) is a pairwise Stone space. The pairwise Stone space (X,τ_{+},τ_{−}) is called the bitopological dual of L. Each pairwise Stone space is bi-homeomorphic to the bitopological dual of some bounded distributive lattice.

Finally, let ≤ be set-theoretic inclusion on the set of prime filters of L and let τ = τ_{+}∨ τ_{−}. Then (X,τ,≤) is a Priestley space. Moreover, φ_{+} is a lattice isomorphism from L onto the lattice of all clopen up-sets of (X,τ,≤). The Priestley space (X,τ,≤) is called the Priestley dual of L. Each Priestley space is isomorphic to the Priestley dual of some bounded distributive lattice.

Let Dist denote the category of bounded distributive lattices and bounded lattice homomorphisms. Then the above three representations of bounded distributive lattices can be extended to dual equivalences between Dist and the categories Spec, PStone, and Pries of spectral spaces with spectral maps, of pairwise Stone spaces with bi-continuous maps, and of Priestley spaces with Priestley morphisms, respectively:

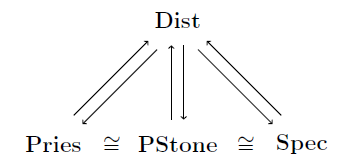
Duality for bounded distributive lattices

Thus, there are three equivalent ways of representing bounded distributive lattices. Each one has its own motivation and advantages, but ultimately they all serve the same purpose of providing better understanding of bounded distributive lattices.

== See also ==
- Representation theorem
- Birkhoff's representation theorem
- Stone's representation theorem for Boolean algebras
- Stone duality
- Esakia duality
