= Representation theorem =

Proof that every structure with certain properties is isomorphic to another structure

In mathematics, representation theorem is a theorem that states that every abstract structure with certain properties is isomorphic to another (abstract or concrete) structure.

== Examples ==
=== Algebra ===
- Cayley's theorem states that every group is isomorphic to a permutation group.
- Holland's embedding theorem states that every lattice-ordered group is isomorphic to a lattice-ordered subgroup of the group of order-preserving permutations of a totally ordered set.
- Representation theory studies properties of abstract groups via their representations as linear transformations of vector spaces.
- Stone's representation theorem for Boolean algebras states that every Boolean algebra is isomorphic to a field of sets.
  A variant, Stone's representation theorem for distributive lattices, states that every distributive lattice is isomorphic to a sublattice of the power set lattice of some set.
  Another variant, Stone's duality, states that there exists a duality (in the sense of an arrow-reversing equivalence) between the categories of Boolean algebras and that of Stone spaces.
- The Poincaré–Birkhoff–Witt theorem states that every Lie algebra embeds into the commutator Lie algebra of its universal enveloping algebra.
- Ado's theorem states that every finite-dimensional Lie algebra over a field of characteristic zero embeds into the Lie algebra of endomorphisms of some finite-dimensional vector space.
- Birkhoff's HSP theorem states that every model of an algebra A is the homomorphic image of a subalgebra of a direct product of copies of A.
- In the study of semigroups, the Wagner–Preston theorem provides a representation of an inverse semigroup S, as a homomorphic image of the set of partial bijections on S, and the semigroup operation given by composition.

=== Category theory ===
- The Yoneda lemma provides a full and faithful limit-preserving embedding of any category into a category of presheaves.
- Mitchell's embedding theorem for abelian categories realises every small abelian category as a full (and exactly embedded) subcategory of a category of modules over some ring.
- Mostowski's collapsing theorem states that every well-founded extensional structure is isomorphic to a transitive set with the ∈-relation.
- One of the fundamental theorems in sheaf theory states that every sheaf over a topological space can be thought of as a sheaf of sections of some (étalé) bundle over that space: the categories of sheaves on a topological space and that of étalé spaces over it are equivalent, where the equivalence is given by the functor that sends a bundle to its sheaf of (local) sections.

=== Functional analysis ===
- The Gelfand–Naimark–Segal construction embeds any C*-algebra in an algebra of bounded operators on some Hilbert space.
- The Gelfand representation (also known as the commutative Gelfand–Naimark theorem) states that any commutative C*-algebra is isomorphic to an algebra of continuous functions on its Gelfand spectrum. It can also be seen as the construction as a duality between the category of commutative C*-algebras and that of compact Hausdorff spaces.
- The Riesz representation theorem states that a Hilbert space, such as the square-integrable function space L^{2}(X) on a manifold X, any linear functional F is equal to the inner product with a fixed element $a\in H$, i.e. $F(v) = \langle a,v\rangle$ for all $v\in H$. The more general Riesz–Markov–Kakutani representation theorem has several versions, one of them identifying the dual space of C_{0}(X) with the set of regular measures on X.

=== Geometry ===
- The Whitney embedding theorems embed any abstract manifold in some Euclidean space.
- The Nash embedding theorem embeds an abstract Riemannian manifold isometrically in a Euclidean space.

=== Order Theory ===
- It is a basic result that every partially ordered set is isomorphic to a collection of sets ordered by inclusion (containment).

=== Economics ===
- A preference representation theorem states conditions for the existence of a utility function representing a preference relation. Examples are Von Neumann–Morgenstern utility theorem and Debreu's representation theorems.

== See also ==
- Classification theorem – Describes the objects of a given type, up to some equivalence
