= Priestley space =

Ordered topological space with special properties

In mathematics, a Priestley space is an ordered topological space with special properties. Priestley spaces are named after Hilary Priestley who introduced and investigated them. Priestley spaces play a fundamental role in the study of distributive lattices. In particular, there is a duality ("Priestley duality") between the category of Priestley spaces and the category of bounded distributive lattices.

== Definition ==
A Priestley space is an ordered topological space (X,τ,≤), i.e. a set X equipped with a partial order ≤ and a topology τ, satisfying the following two conditions:

1. (X,τ) is compact.
2. If $\scriptstyle x\,\not\le\, y$, then there exists a clopen up-set U of X such that x∈U and y∉ U. (This condition is known as the Priestley separation axiom.)

== Properties of Priestley spaces ==
- Each Priestley space is Hausdorff. Indeed, given two points x,y of a Priestley space (X,τ,≤), if x≠ y, then as ≤ is a partial order, either $\scriptstyle x\,\not\le\, y$ or $\scriptstyle y\,\not\le\, x$. Assuming, without loss of generality, that $\scriptstyle x\,\not\le\, y$, (ii) provides a clopen up-set U of X such that x∈ U and y∉ U. Therefore, U and V = X − U are disjoint open subsets of X separating x and y.
- Each Priestley space is also zero-dimensional; that is, each open neighborhood U of a point x of a Priestley space (X,τ,≤) contains a clopen neighborhood C of x. To see this, one proceeds as follows. For each y ∈ X − U, either $\scriptstyle x\,\not\le\, y$ or $\scriptstyle y\,\not\le\, x$. By the Priestley separation axiom, there exists a clopen up-set or a clopen down-set containing x and missing y. The intersection of these clopen neighborhoods of x does not meet X − U. Therefore, as X is compact, there exists a finite intersection of these clopen neighborhoods of x missing X − U. This finite intersection is the desired clopen neighborhood C of x contained in U.

It follows that for each Priestley space (X,τ,≤), the topological space (X,τ) is a Stone space; that is, it is a compact Hausdorff zero-dimensional space.

Some further useful properties of Priestley spaces are listed below.

Let (X,τ,≤) be a Priestley space.

(a) For each closed subset F of X, both ↑ F = {x ∈ X : y ≤ x for some y ∈ F} and ↓ F = { x ∈ X : x ≤ y for some y ∈ F} are closed subsets of X.

(b) Each open up-set of X is a union of clopen up-sets of X and each open down-set of X is a union of clopen down-sets of X.

(c) Each closed up-set of X is an intersection of clopen up-sets of X and each closed down-set of X is an intersection of clopen down-sets of X.

(d) Clopen up-sets and clopen down-sets of X form a subbasis for (X,τ).

(e) For each pair of closed subsets F and G of X, if ↑F ∩ ↓G = ∅, then there exists a clopen up-set U such that F ⊆ U and U ∩ G = ∅.

A Priestley morphism from a Priestley space (X,τ,≤) to another Priestley space (X′,τ′,≤′) is a map f : X → X′ which is continuous and order-preserving.

Let Pries denote the category of Priestley spaces and Priestley morphisms.

== Connection with spectral spaces ==
Priestley spaces are closely related to spectral spaces. For a Priestley space (X,τ,≤), let τ^{u} denote the collection of all open up-sets of X. Similarly, let τ^{d} denote the collection of all open down-sets of X.

Theorem: If (X,τ,≤) is a Priestley space, then both (X,τ^{u}) and (X,τ^{d}) are spectral spaces.

Conversely, given a spectral space (X,τ), let τ^{#} denote the patch topology on X; that is, the topology generated by the subbasis consisting of compact open subsets of (X,τ) and their complements. Let also ≤ denote the specialization order of (X,τ).

Theorem: If (X,τ) is a spectral space, then (X,τ^{#},≤) is a Priestley space.

In fact, this correspondence between Priestley spaces and spectral spaces is functorial and yields an isomorphism between Pries and the category Spec of spectral spaces and spectral maps.

== Connection with bitopological spaces ==
Priestley spaces are also closely related to bitopological spaces.

Theorem: If (X,τ,≤) is a Priestley space, then (X,τ^{u},τ^{d}) is a pairwise Stone space. Conversely, if (X,τ_{1},τ_{2}) is a pairwise Stone space, then (X,τ,≤) is a Priestley space, where τ is the join of τ_{1} and τ_{2} and ≤ is the specialization order of (X,τ_{1}).

The correspondence between Priestley spaces and pairwise Stone spaces is functorial and yields an isomorphism between the category Pries of Priestley spaces and Priestley morphisms and the category PStone of pairwise Stone spaces and bi-continuous maps.

Thus, one has the following isomorphisms of categories:

$\mathbf{Spec}\cong \mathbf{Pries}\cong \mathbf{PStone}$

One of the main consequences of the duality theory for distributive lattices is that each of these categories is dually equivalent to the category of bounded distributive lattices.

== See also ==
- Spectral space
- Pairwise Stone space
- Distributive lattice
- Stone duality
- Duality theory for distributive lattices
