= Stone's theorem =

Stone's theorem may refer to a number of theorems of Marshall Stone:

- Stone's representation theorem for Boolean algebras
- Stone–Weierstrass theorem
- Stone–von Neumann theorem
- Stone's theorem on one-parameter unitary groups

It may also refer to the theorem of A. H. Stone that for Hausdorff spaces the property of being a paracompact space and being a fully normal space are equivalent, or its immediate corollary that metric spaces are paracompact.
