= Pairwise Stone space =

In mathematics and particularly in topology, a pairwise Stone space is a bitopological space $\scriptstyle (X,\tau_1,\tau_2)$ that is pairwise compact, pairwise Hausdorff, and pairwise zero-dimensional.

Pairwise Stone spaces are a bitopological version of Stone spaces.

Pairwise Stone spaces are closely related to spectral spaces.

Theorem: If $\scriptstyle (X,\tau)$ is a spectral space, then $\scriptstyle (X,\tau,\tau^*)$ is a pairwise Stone space, where $\scriptstyle \tau^*$ is the de Groot dual topology of $\scriptstyle \tau$ . Conversely, if $\scriptstyle (X,\tau_1,\tau_2)$ is a pairwise Stone space, then both $\scriptstyle (X,\tau_1)$ and $\scriptstyle (X,\tau_2)$ are spectral spaces.

== See also ==
- Bitopological space
- Duality theory for distributive lattices
