= Polytopological space =

In general topology, a polytopological space consists of a set $X$ together with a family $\{\tau_i\}_{i\in I}$ of topologies on $X$ that is linearly ordered by the inclusion relation where $I$ is an arbitrary index set. It is usually assumed that the topologies are in non-decreasing order. However some authors prefer the associated closure operators $\{k_i\}_{i\in I}$ to be in non-decreasing order where $k_i\leq k_j$ if and only if $k_iA\subseteq k_jA$ for all $A\subseteq X$. This requires non-increasing topologies.

== Formal definitions ==
An $L$-topological space $(X,\tau)$ is a set $X$ together with a monotone map $\tau:L\to$ Top$(X)$ where $(L,\leq)$ is a partially ordered set and Top$(X)$ is the set of all possible topologies on $X,$ ordered by inclusion. When the partial order $\leq$ is a linear order then $(X,\tau)$ is called a polytopological space. Taking $L$ to be the ordinal number $n=\{0,1,\dots,n-1\},$ an $n$-topological space $(X,\tau_0,\dots,\tau_{n-1})$ can be thought of as a set $X$ with topologies $\tau_0\subseteq\dots\subseteq\tau_{n-1}$ on it. More generally a multitopological space $(X,\tau)$ is a set $X$ together with an arbitrary family $\tau$ of topologies on it.

== History ==
Polytopological spaces were introduced in 2008 by the philosopher Thomas Icard for the purpose of defining a topological model of Japaridze's polymodal logic (GLP). They were later used to generalize variants of Kuratowski's closure-complement problem. For example Taras Banakh et al. proved that under operator composition the $n$ closure operators and complement operator on an arbitrary $n$-topological space can together generate at most $2\cdot K(n)$ distinct operators where $K(n)=\sum_{i,j=0}^n\tbinom{i+j}{i} \cdot \tbinom{i+j}{j}.$In 1965 the Finnish logician Jaakko Hintikka found this bound for the case $n=2$ and claimed it "does not appear to obey any very simple law as a function of $n$".

== See also ==
- Bitopological space
