= Complemented lattice =

Bound lattice in which every element has a complement

Hasse diagram of a complemented lattice. A point p and a line l of the Fano plane are complements if and only if p does not lie on l.

In the mathematical discipline of order theory, a complemented lattice is a bounded lattice (with least element 0 and greatest element 1), in which every element a has a complement, i.e. an element b satisfying a ∨ b = 1 and a ∧ b = 0. Complements need not be unique.

A relatively complemented lattice is a lattice such that every interval [c, d], viewed as a bounded lattice in its own right, is a complemented lattice.

An orthocomplementation on a complemented lattice is an involution that is order-reversing and maps each element to a complement. An orthocomplemented lattice satisfying a weak form of the modular law is called an orthomodular lattice.

In bounded distributive lattices, complements are unique. Every complemented distributive lattice has a unique orthocomplementation and is in fact a Boolean algebra.

== Definition and basic properties ==
A complemented lattice is a bounded lattice (with least element 0 and greatest element 1), in which every element a has a complement, i.e. an element b such that

a ∨ b = 1 and a ∧ b = 0.

In general an element may have more than one complement. However, in a (bounded) distributive lattice every element will have at most one complement. A lattice in which every element has exactly one complement is called a uniquely complemented lattice

A lattice with the property that every interval (viewed as a sublattice) is complemented is called a relatively complemented lattice. In other words, a relatively complemented lattice is characterized by the property that for every element a in an interval [c, d] there is an element b such that

a ∨ b = d and a ∧ b = c.

Such an element b is called a complement of a relative to the interval.

A distributive lattice is complemented if and only if it is bounded and relatively complemented. The lattice of subspaces of a vector space provide an example of a complemented lattice that is not, in general, distributive.

== Orthocomplementation ==
An orthocomplementation on a bounded lattice is a function that maps each element a to an "orthocomplement" a^{⊥} in such a way that the following axioms are satisfied:

Complement law
a^{⊥} ∨ a = 1 and a^{⊥} ∧ a = 0.
Involution law
a^{⊥⊥} = a.
Order-reversing
if a ≤ b then b^{⊥} ≤ a^{⊥}.

An orthocomplemented lattice or ortholattice is a bounded lattice equipped with an orthocomplementation. The lattice of subspaces of an inner product space, and the orthogonal complement operation, provides an example of an orthocomplemented lattice that is not, in general, distributive.

In the pentagon lattice N_{5}, the node on the right-hand side has two complements.

The diamond lattice M_{3} admits no orthocomplementation.

The lattice M_{4} admits 3 orthocomplementations.

The hexagon lattice admits a unique orthocomplementation, but it is not uniquely complemented.

Boolean algebras are a special case of orthocomplemented lattices, which in turn are a special case of complemented lattices (with extra structure). The ortholattices are most often used in quantum logic, where the closed subspaces of a separable Hilbert space represent quantum propositions and behave as an orthocomplemented lattice.

Orthocomplemented lattices, like Boolean algebras, satisfy de Morgan's laws:

- (a ∨ b)^{⊥} = a^{⊥} ∧ b^{⊥}
- (a ∧ b)^{⊥} = a^{⊥} ∨ b^{⊥}.

== Orthomodular lattices ==
A lattice is called modular if for all elements a, b and c the implication

if a ≤ c, then a ∨ (b ∧ c) = (a ∨ b) ∧ c

holds. This is weaker than distributivity; e.g. the above-shown lattice M_{3} is modular, but not distributive.

A natural further weakening of this condition for orthocomplemented lattices, necessary for applications in quantum logic, is to require it only in the special case b = a^{⊥}. An orthomodular lattice is therefore defined as an orthocomplemented lattice such that for any two elements the implication

if a ≤ c, then a ∨ (a^{⊥} ∧ c) = c

holds.

Lattices of this form are of crucial importance for the study of quantum logic, since they are part of the axiomisation of the Hilbert space formulation of quantum mechanics. Garrett Birkhoff and John von Neumann observed that the propositional calculus in quantum logic is "formally indistinguishable from the calculus of linear subspaces [of a Hilbert space] with respect to set products, linear sums and orthogonal complements" corresponding to the roles of and, or and not in Boolean lattices. This remark has spurred interest in the closed subspaces of a Hilbert space, which form an orthomodular lattice.

== See also ==
- Pseudocomplemented lattice
