= Doreen Thomas =

South African and Australian engineer and mathematician

Doreen Anne Thomas AM FTSE
- Occupation: Professor of Mechanical Engineering
- Employer: University of Melbourne

Doreen Anne Thomas is an Australian mathematician and electrical and mechanical engineer. She is an emeritus professor of Mechanical Engineering at Melbourne University and director of the start-up company MineOptima.

== Career ==
Thomas earned her BSc from the University of Cape Town, and another from the University of Witwatersrand. At Oxford she earned an MSc and a D.Phil in 1976, with a mathematical dissertation entitled Problems in Functional Analysis supervised by Hilary Priestley. Her mathematical in network analysis work led to her contributions in electrical and mechanical engineering.

As professor in the many engineering schools, in mathematics and statistics and as associate dean of research and research training at Melbourne she has done much to encourage women to be engineers. The engineering faculty of Melbourne University honours her work by offering postdoctoral scholarships in her name. In 2006 she as appointed as the University of Melbourne's first female professor of Engineering. She is a Fellow of the Australian Academy of Technological Sciences and Engineering and a Fellow of Engineers Australia. She also has over 150 publications in international peer reviewed journals and conference proceedings.

She commercialised her mining software optimising mine design via her start-up company MineOptima which was acquired by the mining software company RPM. This software, which reduces development time and haulage costs in underground tunnel design, has been licensed to some of the world's largest mining companies.

== Awards ==
- In 2011 Thomas was awarded with a Citation for an Outstanding Contribution to Student Learning by the Australian Learning and Teaching Council.
- In 2012 she was elected a Fellow of the Australian Academy of Technological Sciences and Engineering.
- In 2019 she was inducted into the Victorian Honour Roll of Women.
- In 2021 she was recognised for her significant service to tertiary engineering education and research, and to women, in this that years Queen's Birthday Honours (see: 2021 Queen's Birthday Honours (Australia)).

== Selected publications ==
- M. Brazil; C.J. Ras; D.A. Thomas (March 2016). "An exact algorithm for the bottleneck 2-connected k -Steiner network problem in L p planes". Discrete Applied Mathematics. 201: 47–69. doi:10.1016/J.DAM.2015.07.029. ISSN 0166-218X. Zbl 1329.05268. Wikidata Q61714566.
- Julian de Hoog; Tansu Alpcan; Marcus Brazil; Doreen Anne Thomas; Iven Mareels (January 2015). "Optimal Charging of Electric Vehicles Taking Distribution Network Constraints Into Account" (PDF). IEEE Transactions on Power Systems. 30 (1): 365–375. doi:10.1109/TPWRS.2014.2318293. ISSN 0885-8950. Wikidata Q61714578.
- P. A. GROSSMAN; M. BRAZIL; J. H. RUBINSTEIN; D. A. THOMAS (June 2013). "MINIMAL CURVATURE-CONSTRAINED PATHS IN THE PLANE WITH A CONSTRAINT ON ARCS WITH OPPOSITE ORIENTATIONS". International Journal of Computational Geometry and Applications. 23 (03): 171–196. doi:10.1142/S0218195913500064. ISSN 0218-1959. Zbl 1330.65086. Wikidata Q61714606.
- Robert R Kerr; Anthony N. Burkitt; Doreen Thomas; Matthieu Gilson; David B Grayden (7 February 2013). "Delay selection by spike-timing-dependent plasticity in recurrent networks of spiking neurons receiving oscillatory inputs". PLOS Computational Biology. 9 (2) e1002897. doi:10.1371/JOURNAL.PCBI.1002897. ISSN 1553-734X. PMC 3567188. PMID 23408878. Wikidata Q34585649.
- M. Brazil; D.A. Thomas (2006). "Network optimization for the design of underground mines". Networks. 49 (1): 40–50. doi:10.1002/NET.20140. ISSN 0028-3045. Zbl 1131.90410. Wikidata Q61714626.
