= Hilary Priestley =

British mathematician

Hilary Ann Priestley
- Education: University of Oxford
- Scientific career
- Fields: Lattice theory, universal algebra, mathematical logic
- Workplaces: University of Oxford
- Thesis: Topics in Ordered Topological Spaces, Including a Representation Theory for Distributive Lattices (1970)
- Doctoral advisor: David Edwards
- Doctoral students: Michael H. Albert, Doreen Thomas

Hilary Ann Priestley is a British mathematician. She is a professor at the University of Oxford and a Fellow of St Anne's College, Oxford, where she has been Tutor in Mathematics since 1972.

Hilary Priestley introduced ordered separable topological spaces; such topological spaces are now usually called Priestley spaces in her honour. The term "Priestley duality" is also used for her application of these spaces in the representation theory of distributive lattices.

== Books ==
- Priestley, Hilary A. (2003). Introduction to Complex Analysis (2nd ed.). Oxford University Press. ISBN 978-0-19-852562-2.
- Davey, Brian A.; Priestley, Hilary A. (2002). Introduction to Lattices and Order (2nd ed.). Cambridge University Press. ISBN 9780521784511.
- Priestley, Hilary A. (1997). Introduction to Integration. Oxford University Press. ISBN 978-0-19-850123-7.
