= Spectral space =

Space homeomorphic to some ring spectrum

In mathematics, a spectral space is a topological space that is homeomorphic to the spectrum of a commutative ring. It is sometimes also called a coherent space because of the connection to coherent topoi.

== Definition ==
Let X be a topological space and let K^{$\circ$}(X) be the set of all compact open subsets of X. Then X is said to be spectral if it satisfies all of the following conditions:

- X is compact.
- K^{$\circ$}(X) is a basis of open subsets of X.
- K^{$\circ$}(X) is closed under finite intersections.
- X is sober, i.e., every nonempty irreducible closed subset of X has a unique generic point.

From that X is sober it follows that X is T_{0}. Indeed the definition of a spectral space can be equivalently reformulated through explicitly assuming that X is T_{0} and weaking the assumption that X is sober to only require it to be quasi-sober, i.e. every irreducible closed subspace possesses a (not nececssarily unique) generic point. This is the way the definition was originally formulated in Hochster's 1967 thesis, in which the term "spectral space" was first coined.

== Equivalent descriptions ==
Let X be a topological space. Each of the following properties are equivalent to the property of X being spectral:

1. X is homeomorphic to a projective limit of finite T_{0} spaces.
2. X is homeomorphic to the spectrum of a bounded distributive lattice L. In this case, L is isomorphic (as a bounded lattice) to the lattice K^{$\circ$}(X) (this is called Stone representation of distributive lattices).
3. X is homeomorphic to the spectrum of a commutative ring.
4. X is the topological space determined by a Priestley space.
5. X is a T_{0} space whose locale of open sets is coherent (and every coherent locale comes from a unique spectral space in this way).

== Properties ==
Let X be a spectral space and let K^{$\circ$}(X) be as before. Then:

- K^{$\circ$}(X) is a bounded sublattice of subsets of X.
- Every closed subspace of X is spectral.
- An arbitrary intersection of compact and open subsets of X (hence of elements from K^{$\circ$}(X)) is again spectral.
- X is T_{0} by definition, but in general not T_{1}. In fact a spectral space is T_{1} if and only if it is Hausdorff (i.e. T_{2}) if and only if it is a boolean space if and only if K^{$\circ$}(X) is a boolean algebra.
- X can be seen as a pairwise Stone space.

== Spectral maps ==
A spectral map f: X → Y between spectral spaces X and Y is a continuous map such that the preimage of every open and compact subset of Y under f is again compact.

The category of spectral spaces, which has spectral maps as morphisms, is dually equivalent to the category of bounded distributive lattices (together with homomorphisms of such lattices). In this anti-equivalence, a spectral space X corresponds to the lattice K^{$\circ$}(X).
