= Stone space =

Type of topological space

In topology and related areas of mathematics, a Stone space, also known as a profinite space, profinite set, or Boolean space, is a compact Hausdorff totally disconnected space. Stone spaces are named after Marshall Harvey Stone who introduced and studied them in the 1930s in the course of his investigation of Boolean algebras, which culminated in his representation theorem for Boolean algebras.

== Equivalent conditions ==
The following conditions on the topological space $X$ are equivalent:

- $X$ is a Stone space;
- $X$ is homeomorphic to the projective limit (in the category of topological spaces) of an inverse system of finite discrete spaces;
- $X$ is compact and totally separated;
- $X$ is compact, T_{0}, and zero-dimensional (in the sense of the small inductive dimension);
- $X$ is coherent and Hausdorff.

== Examples ==
Important examples of Stone spaces include finite discrete spaces, the Cantor set and the space $\Z_p$ of $p$-adic integers, where $p$ is any prime number. Generalizing these examples, any product of arbitrarily many finite discrete spaces is a Stone space, and the topological space underlying any profinite group is a Stone space. The Stone–Čech compactification of the natural numbers with the discrete topology, or indeed of any discrete space, is a Stone space.

== Stone's representation theorem for Boolean algebras ==
To every Boolean algebra $B$ we can associate a Stone space $S(B)$ as follows: the elements of $S(B)$ are the ultrafilters on $B,$ and the topology on $S(B),$ called the Stone topology, is generated by the sets of the form $\{ F \in S(B) : b \in F \},$ where $b \in B.$

Stone's representation theorem for Boolean algebras states that every Boolean algebra is isomorphic to the Boolean algebra of clopen sets of the Stone space $S(B)$; and furthermore, every Stone space $X$ is homeomorphic to the Stone space belonging to the Boolean algebra of clopen sets of $X.$ These assignments are functorial, and we obtain a category-theoretic duality between the category of Boolean algebras (with homomorphisms as morphisms) and the category of Stone spaces (with continuous maps as morphisms).

Stone's theorem gave rise to a number of similar dualities, now collectively known as Stone dualities.

== Condensed mathematics ==
The category of Stone spaces with continuous maps is equivalent to the pro-category of the category of finite sets, which explains the term "profinite sets". The profinite sets are at the heart of the project of condensed mathematics, which aims to replace topological spaces with "condensed sets", where a topological space X is replaced by the functor that takes a profinite set S to the set of continuous maps from S to X.

== See also ==
- Stone–Čech compactification#Construction using ultrafilters – Concept in topology
- Filters in topology – Use of filters to describe and characterize all basic topological notions and results
- Type (model theory) – Concept in model theory
