= Stone's representation theorem for Boolean algebras =

Every Boolean algebra is isomorphic to a certain field of sets

In mathematics, Stone's representation theorem for Boolean algebras states that every Boolean algebra is isomorphic to a certain field of sets. The theorem is fundamental to the deeper understanding of Boolean algebra that emerged in the first half of the 20th century. The theorem was first proved by Marshall H. Stone. Stone was led to it by his study of the spectral theory of operators on a Hilbert space.

== Stone spaces ==
Each Boolean algebra B has an associated topological space, denoted here S(B), called its Stone space. The points in S(B) are the ultrafilters on B, or equivalently the homomorphisms from B to the two-element Boolean algebra. The topology on S(B) is generated by a basis consisting of all sets of the form
$$\{ x \in S(B) \mid b \in x\},$$
where b is an element of B. These sets are also closed and so are clopen (both closed and open). This is the topology of pointwise convergence of nets of homomorphisms into the two-element Boolean algebra.

For every Boolean algebra B, S(B) is a compact totally disconnected Hausdorff space; such spaces are called Stone spaces (also profinite spaces). Conversely, given any Stone space X, the collection of subsets of X that are clopen is a Boolean algebra.

== Representation theorem ==
A simple version of Stone's representation theorem states that every Boolean algebra B is isomorphic to the algebra of clopen subsets of its Stone space S(B). The isomorphism sends an element $b \in B$ to the set of all ultrafilters that contain b. This is a clopen set because of the choice of topology on S(B) and because B is a Boolean algebra.

Restating the theorem using the language of category theory; the theorem states that there is a duality between the category of Boolean algebras and the category of Stone spaces. This duality means that in addition to the correspondence between Boolean algebras and their Stone spaces, each homomorphism from a Boolean algebra A to a Boolean algebra B corresponds in a natural way to a continuous function from S(B) to S(A). In other words, there is a contravariant functor that gives an equivalence between the categories. The inverse functor's action on morphisms maps a continuous map between Stone spaces $f : S(B_1) \to S(B_2)$ to the morphism of Boolean algebras $B_2 \to B_1$ which sends an element $x$ of $B_2$, identified to a clopen subset of $S(B_2)$, to the inverse image $f^{-1}(x)$, a clopen subset of $S(B_1)$ identified to an element of $B_1$. This was an early example of a nontrivial duality of categories.

The theorem is a special case of Stone duality, a more general framework for dualities between topological spaces and partially ordered sets.

The proof requires either the axiom of choice or a weakened form of it. Specifically, the theorem is equivalent to the Boolean prime ideal theorem, a weakened choice principle that states that every Boolean algebra has a prime ideal.

An extension of the classical Stone duality to the category of Boolean spaces (that is, zero-dimensional locally compact Hausdorff spaces) and continuous maps (respectively, perfect maps) was obtained by G. D. Dimov (respectively, by H. P. Doctor).

== See also ==
- Stone's representation theorem for distributive lattices
- Representation theorem – Proof that every structure with certain properties is isomorphic to another structure
- Field of sets – Algebraic concept in measure theory, also referred to as an algebra of sets
- List of Boolean algebra topics
- Stonean space – Topological space in which the closure of every open set is open
- Profinite group – Topological group that is in a certain sense assembled from a system of finite groups
- Ultrafilter lemma – Maximal proper filter
