= Bitopological space =

Set endowed with two topologies

In mathematics, a bitopological space is a set endowed with two topologies. Typically, if the set is $X$ and the topologies are $\sigma$ and $\tau$ then the bitopological space is referred to as $(X,\sigma,\tau)$. The notion was introduced by J. C. Kelly in the study of quasimetrics, i.e. distance functions that are not required to be symmetric.

== Continuity ==
A map $f:X\to X'$ from a bitopological space $(X,\tau_1,\tau_2)$ to another bitopological space $(X',\tau_1',\tau_2')$ is called continuous or sometimes pairwise continuous if $f$ is continuous both as a map from $(X,\tau_1)$ to $(X',\tau_1')$ and as map from $(X,\tau_2)$ to $(X',\tau_2')$.

== Bitopological variants of topological properties ==
Corresponding to well-known properties of topological spaces, there are versions for bitopological spaces.

- A bitopological space $(X,\tau_1,\tau_2)$ is pairwise compact if each cover $\{U_i\mid i\in I\}$ of $X$ with $U_i\in \tau_1\cup\tau_2$, contains a finite subcover. In this case, $\{U_i\mid i\in I\}$ must contain at least one member from $\tau_1$ and at least one member from $\tau_2$
- A bitopological space $(X,\tau_1,\tau_2)$ is pairwise Hausdorff if for any two distinct points $x,y\in X$ there exist disjoint $U_1\in \tau_1$ and $U_2\in\tau_2$ with $x\in U_1$ and $y\in U_2$.
- A bitopological space $(X,\tau_1,\tau_2)$ is pairwise zero-dimensional if opens in $(X,\tau_1)$ that are closed in $(X,\tau_2)$ form a basis for $(X,\tau_1)$, and opens in $(X,\tau_2)$ that are closed in $(X,\tau_1)$ form a basis for $(X,\tau_2)$.
- A bitopological space $(X,\sigma,\tau)$ is called binormal if for every $F_\sigma$ $\sigma$-closed and $F_\tau$ $\tau$-closed sets there are $G_\sigma$ $\sigma$-open and $G_\tau$ $\tau$-open sets such that $F_\sigma\subseteq G_\tau$ $F_\tau\subseteq G_\sigma$, and $G_\sigma\cap G_\tau= \empty.$

== See also ==
- Polytopological space
