= Bounded complete poset =

In the mathematical field of order theory, a partially ordered set is bounded complete if all of its subsets that have some upper bound also have a least upper bound. Such a partial order can also be called consistently or coherently complete (Visser 2004, p. 182), since any upper bound of a set can be interpreted as some consistent (non-contradictory) piece of information that extends all the information present in the set. Hence the presence of some upper bound in a way guarantees the consistency of a set. Bounded completeness then yields the existence of a least upper bound of any "consistent" subset, which can be regarded as the most general piece of information that captures all the knowledge present within this subset. This view closely relates to the idea of information ordering that one typically finds in domain theory.

Formally, a partially ordered set (P, ≤) is bounded complete if the following holds for any subset S of P:

If S has some upper bound, then it also has a least upper bound.

Bounded completeness has various relationships to other completeness properties, which are detailed in the article on completeness in order theory. The term bounded poset is sometimes used to refer to a partially ordered set that has both a least element and greatest element. Hence it is important to distinguish between a bounded-complete poset and a bounded complete partial order (cpo).

For a typical example of a bounded-complete poset, consider the set of all finite decimal numbers starting with "0." (like 0.1, 0.234, 0.122) together with all infinite such numbers (like the decimal representation 0.1111... of 1/9). Now these elements can be ordered based on the prefix order of words: a decimal number n is below some other number m if there is some string of digits w such that nw = m. For example, 0.2 is below 0.234, since one can obtain the latter by appending the string "34" to 0.2. The infinite decimal numbers are the maximal elements within this order. In general, subsets of this order do not have least upper bounds: just consider the set {0.1, 0.3}. Looking back at the above intuition, one might say that it is not consistent to assume that some number starts both with 0.1 and with 0.3. However, the order is still bounded complete. In fact, it is even an example of a more specialized class of structures, the Scott domains, which provide many other examples for bounded-complete posets.
