= DCPO =

DCPO or Dcpo may refer to:

- Dame Commander of the Order of Pope Pius IX, a class of the papal order of knighthood
- Directed complete partial order, in mathematics
