= Muffy Calder =

Computer Scientist

Dame Muffy Calder DBE FREng FRSE FBCS FIEE
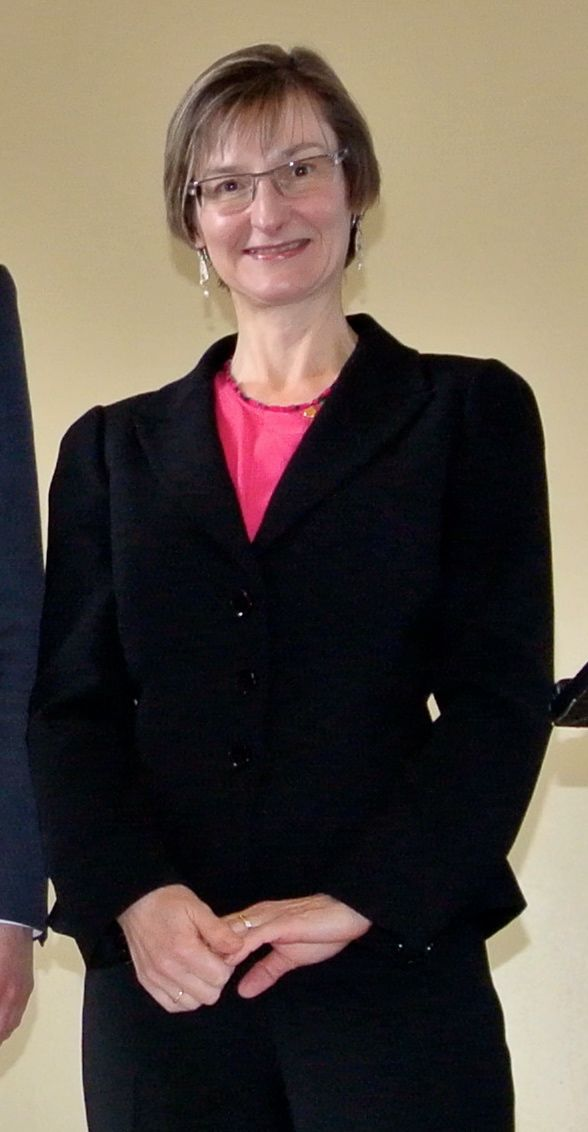
- Calder at the University of St Andrews in 2013
- Born: Muffy Thomas; 21 May 1958 (age 68); Shawinigan, Quebec
- Education: University of Stirling (BSc); University of St Andrews (PhD)
- Known for: feature interaction problem Chief Scientific Advisor for Scotland
- Spouse: David James Calder (1998-present)
- Awards: FRSE (2000); FIEE (2002); FBCS (2002); OBE (2011); FREng (2013); DSc (2024)
- Scientific career
- Fields: formal methods
- Workplaces: University of Glasgow; University of Stirling; University of St Andrews; University of Edinburgh
- Thesis: The imperative implementation of algebraic data types (1988)
- Doctoral advisor: Roy Dyckhoff
- Website: www.dcs.gla.ac.uk/~muffy

Dame Muffy Calder (née Thomas; born 21 May 1958) is a Canadian-born British computer scientist, Vice-Principal and Head of College of Science and Engineering, and Professor of Formal Methods at the University of Glasgow. From 2012 to 2015 she was Chief Scientific Advisor to the Scottish Government.

== Biography ==
Calder was born Muffy Thomas on 21 May 1958 in Shawinigan, Quebec, Canada to Carmen and Lois (Hallen) van Thomas. She graduated with a BSc degree in computer science from the University of Stirling, and completed a PhD in computational science at the University of St Andrews in 1987 under the supervision of Roy Dyckhoff. She published widely under the surname Thomas prior to her marriage to David Calder in 1998.

She has worked at the University of Glasgow since 1988, and was Dean of Research in the College of Science and Engineering until 2012. She became Chief Scientific Adviser to the Scottish Government on 1 March 2012. Previously Calder has served as Chair of the UK Computing Research Committee and Chair of the British Computer Society Academy of Computing Research Committee. She became Vice-Principal and Head of College of Science and Engineering in 2015. In 2015 she was appointed to the Council of the Engineering and Physical Sciences Research Council.

== Research ==
Calder summarises her research interests as "mathematical modelling and automated reasoning for concurrent, communicating systems". Calder published an influential overview on the feature interaction problem, with more than 300 citations at Google Scholar. Her research has extended to applying computer science methods to biochemical networks and cell signalling in bioinformatics, resulting in a number of papers.

== Awards and recognition ==
Calder was appointed Order of the British Empire (OBE) in the 2011 New Year Honours for services to computer science and Dame Commander of the Order of the British Empire (DBE) in the 2020 Birthday Honours for services to research and education.

She holds fellowships of the Royal Society of Edinburgh (2000), the British Computer Society (2002), the Institution of Electrical Engineers (2002) and the Royal Academy of Engineering (2013).

In June 2024 Calder was awarded a DSc honoris causa by the University of St Andrews in recognition of her contributions to computer science and her services to the wider scientific community.

Calder was listed as 21st most influential woman in Scotland, 2012, by The Herald.
