= Markowsky's theorem =

Theorem in order theory

In mathematics, Markowsky's theorem states: every chain-complete poset is a dcpo where

- a poset is chain-complete if each chain in it has a least upper bound.
- a poset is a dcpo if each directed set in it has a least upper bound.

Since a dcpo is chain-complete (as a chain is directed), the converse of the theorem is trivial.

A known proof uses Iwamura's lemma and ordinals.
