= Kleene fixed-point theorem =

Theorem in order theory and lattice theory

Computation of the least fixpoint of f(x) = 1/10x^{2}+atan(x)+1 using Kleene's theorem in the real interval [0,7] with the usual order

In the mathematical areas of order and lattice theory, the Kleene fixed-point theorem, named after American mathematician Stephen Cole Kleene, states the following:

Kleene Fixed-Point Theorem. Suppose $(L, \sqsubseteq)$ is a directed-complete partial order (dcpo) with a least element, and let $f: L \to L$ be a Scott-continuous (and therefore monotone) function. Then $f$ has a least fixed point, which is the supremum of the ascending Kleene chain of $f.$

The ascending Kleene chain of f is the chain

$$\bot  \sqsubseteq  f(\bot) \sqsubseteq f(f(\bot)) \sqsubseteq \cdots \sqsubseteq f^n(\bot) \sqsubseteq \cdots$$

obtained by iterating f on the least element ⊥ of L. Expressed in a formula, the theorem states that

$$\textrm{lfp}(f) = \sup \left(\left\{f^n(\bot) \mid n\in\mathbb{N}\right\}\right)$$

where $\textrm{lfp}$ denotes the least fixed point.

Although Tarski's fixed point theorem does not consider how fixed points can be computed by iterating f from some seed (also, it pertains to monotone functions on complete lattices), this result is often attributed to Alfred Tarski who proves it for additive functions. Moreover, the Kleene fixed-point theorem can be extended to monotone functions using transfinite iterations.

== Proof ==
We first have to show that the ascending Kleene chain of $f$ exists in $L$. To show that, we prove the following:

Lemma. If $L$ is a dcpo with a least element, and $f: L \to L$ is Scott-continuous, then $f^n(\bot) \sqsubseteq f^{n+1}(\bot), n \in \mathbb{N}_0$

Proof. We use induction:
- Assume n = 0. Then $f^0(\bot) = \bot \sqsubseteq f^1(\bot),$ since $\bot$ is the least element.
- Assume n > 0. Then we have to show that $f^n(\bot) \sqsubseteq f^{n+1}(\bot)$. By rearranging we get $f(f^{n-1}(\bot)) \sqsubseteq f(f^n(\bot))$. By inductive assumption, we know that $f^{n-1}(\bot) \sqsubseteq f^n(\bot)$ holds, and because f is monotone (property of Scott-continuous functions), the result holds as well.

As a corollary of the Lemma we have the following directed ω-chain:

$$\mathbb{M} = \{ \bot, f(\bot), f(f(\bot)), \ldots\}.$$

From the definition of a dcpo it follows that $\mathbb{M}$ has a supremum, call it $m.$ What remains now is to show that $m$ is the least fixed-point.

First, we show that $m$ is a fixed point, i.e. that $f(m) = m$. Because $f$ is Scott-continuous, $f(\sup(\mathbb{M})) = \sup(f(\mathbb{M}))$, that is $f(m) = \sup(f(\mathbb{M}))$. Also, since $\mathbb{M} = f(\mathbb{M})\cup\{\bot\}$ and because $\bot$ has no influence in determining the supremum we have: $\sup(f(\mathbb{M})) = \sup(\mathbb{M})$. It follows that $f(m) = m$, making $m$ a fixed-point of $f$.

The proof that $m$ is in fact the least fixed point can be done by showing that any element in $\mathbb{M}$ is smaller than any fixed-point of $f$ (because by property of supremum, if all elements of a set $D \subseteq L$ are smaller than an element of $L$ then also $\sup(D)$ is smaller than that same element of $L$). This is done by induction: Assume $k$ is some fixed-point of $f$. We now prove by induction over $i$ that $\forall i \in \mathbb{N}: f^i(\bot) \sqsubseteq k$. The base of the induction $(i = 0)$ obviously holds: $f^0(\bot) = \bot \sqsubseteq k,$ since $\bot$ is the least element of $L$. As the induction hypothesis, we may assume that $f^i(\bot) \sqsubseteq k$. We now do the induction step: From the induction hypothesis and the monotonicity of $f$ (again, implied by the Scott-continuity of $f$), we may conclude the following: $f^i(\bot) \sqsubseteq k ~\implies~ f^{i+1}(\bot) \sqsubseteq f(k).$ Now, by the assumption that $k$ is a fixed-point of $f,$ we know that $f(k) = k,$ and from that we get $f^{i+1}(\bot) \sqsubseteq k.$

== See also ==
- Other fixed-point theorems
