= Compact element =

In the mathematical area of order theory, the compact elements or finite elements of a partially ordered set are those elements that cannot be subsumed by a supremum of any non-empty directed set that does not already contain members above the compact element. This notion of compactness simultaneously generalizes the notions of finite sets in set theory, compact sets in topology, and finitely generated modules in algebra. (There are other notions of compactness in mathematics.)

== Formal definition ==
In a partially ordered set (P,≤) an element c is called compact (or finite) if it satisfies one of the following equivalent conditions:

- For every directed subset D of P, if D has a supremum sup D and c ≤ sup D then c ≤ d for some element d of D.
- For every ideal I of P, if I has a supremum sup I and c ≤ sup I then c is an element of I.

If the poset P additionally is a join-semilattice (i.e., if it has binary suprema) then these conditions are equivalent to the following statement:

- For every subset S of P, if S has a supremum sup S and c ≤ sup S, then c ≤ sup T for some finite subset T of S.

In particular, if c = sup S, then c is the supremum of a finite subset of S.

These equivalences are easily verified from the definitions of the concepts involved. For the case of a join-semilattice, any set can be turned into a directed set with the same supremum by closing under finite (non-empty) suprema.

When considering directed complete partial orders or complete lattices the additional requirements that the specified suprema exist can of course be dropped. A join-semilattice that is directed complete is almost a complete lattice (possibly lacking a least element)—see completeness (order theory) for details.

== Examples ==
- The most basic example is obtained by considering the power set of some set A, ordered by subset inclusion. Within this complete lattice, the compact elements are exactly the finite subsets of A. This justifies the name "finite element".
- The term "compact" is inspired by the definition of (topologically) compact subsets of a topological space T. A set Y is compact if for every collection of open sets S, if the union over S includes Y as a subset, then Y is included as a subset of the union of a finite subcollection of S. Considering the power set of T as a complete lattice with the subset inclusion order, where the supremum of a collection of sets is given by their union, the topological condition for compactness mimics the condition for compactness in join-semilattices, but for the additional requirement of openness.
- If it exists, the least element of a poset is always compact. It may be that this is the only compact element, as the example of the real unit interval [0,1] (with the standard ordering inherited from the real numbers) shows.
- Every completely join-prime element of a lattice is compact.

== Algebraic posets ==
A poset in which every element is the supremum of the directed set formed by the compact elements below it is called an algebraic poset. Such posets that are dcpos are much used in domain theory.

As an important special case, an algebraic lattice is a complete lattice L where every element x of L is the supremum of the compact elements below x.

A typical example (which served as the motivation for the name "algebraic") is the following:

For any algebraic system A (for example, a group, a ring, a field, a lattice, etc.; or even a mere set without any operations), let Sub(A) be the set of all substructures of A, i.e., of all subsets of A which are closed under all operations of A (group addition, ring addition and multiplication, etc.). Here the notion of substructure includes the empty substructure in case the algebra A has no nullary operations.

Then:

- The set Sub(A), ordered by set inclusion, is a lattice.
- The greatest element of Sub(A) is the set A itself.
- For any S, T in Sub(A), the greatest lower bound of S and T is the set theoretic intersection of S and T; the smallest upper bound is the subalgebra generated by the union of S and T.
- The set Sub(A) is even a complete lattice. The greatest lower bound of any family of substructures is their intersection (or A if the family is empty).
- The compact elements of Sub(A) are exactly the finitely generated substructures of A.
- Every substructure is the union of its finitely generated substructures; hence Sub(A) is an algebraic lattice.

Also, a kind of converse holds: Every algebraic lattice is isomorphic to Sub(A) for some algebra A.

There is another algebraic lattice that plays an important role in universal algebra: For every algebra A we let Con(A) be the set of all congruence relations on A. Each congruence on A is a subalgebra of the product algebra AxA, so Con(A) ⊆ Sub(AxA). Again we have

- Con(A), ordered by set inclusion, is a lattice.
- The greatest element of Con(A) is the set AxA, which is the congruence corresponding to the constant homomorphism. The smallest congruence is the diagonal of AxA, corresponding to isomorphisms.
- Con(A) is a complete lattice.
- The compact elements of Con(A) are exactly the finitely generated congruences.
- Con(A) is an algebraic lattice.

Again there is a converse: By a theorem of George Grätzer and E. T. Schmidt, every algebraic lattice is isomorphic to Con(A) for some algebra A.

== Applications ==
Compact elements are important in computer science in the semantic approach called domain theory, where they are considered as a kind of primitive element: the information represented by compact elements cannot be obtained by any approximation that does not already contain this knowledge. Compact elements cannot be approximated by elements strictly below them. On the other hand, it may happen that all non-compact elements can be obtained as directed suprema of compact elements. This is a desirable situation, since the set of compact elements is often smaller than the original poset—the examples above illustrate this.

== Literature ==
See the literature given for order theory and domain theory.
