= Linear order (disambiguation) =

Linear order (or total order) is the order of two comparable elements in mathematics.

Linear order may refer to:

- Linear order (linguistics), the order of words or phrases in linguistics
- Dense linear order, in mathematics

== See also ==
- Linearly ordered group
