= Representation (mathematics) =

An object whose endomorphisms are isomorphic to another structure

In mathematics, a representation is a very general relationship that expresses similarities (or equivalences) between mathematical objects or structures. Roughly speaking, a collection Y of mathematical objects may be said to represent another collection X of objects, provided that the properties and relationships existing among the representing objects y_{i} conform, in some consistent way, to those existing among the corresponding represented objects x_{i}. More specifically, given a set Π of properties and relations, a Π-representation of some structure X is a structure Y that is the image of X under a homomorphism that preserves Π. The label representation is sometimes also applied to the homomorphism itself (such as group homomorphism in group theory).

== Representation theory ==
Perhaps the most well-developed example of this general notion is the subfield of abstract algebra called representation theory, which studies the representing of elements of algebraic structures by linear transformations of vector spaces.

== Other examples ==
Although the term representation theory is well established in the algebraic sense discussed above, there are many other uses of the term representation throughout mathematics.

=== Graph theory ===
An active area of graph theory is the exploration of isomorphisms between graphs and other structures. A key class of such problems stems from the fact that, like adjacency in undirected graphs, intersection of sets (or, more precisely, non-disjointness) is a symmetric relation. This gives rise to the study of intersection graphs for innumerable families of sets. One foundational result here, due to Paul Erdős and his colleagues, is that every n-vertex graph may be represented in terms of intersection among subsets of a set of size no more than n^{2}/4.

Representing a graph by such algebraic structures as its adjacency matrix and Laplacian matrix gives rise to the field of spectral graph theory.

=== Order theory ===
Dual to the observation above that every graph is an intersection graph is the fact that every partially ordered set (also known as poset) is isomorphic to a collection of sets ordered by the inclusion (or containment) relation ⊆. Some posets that arise as the inclusion orders for natural classes of objects include the Boolean lattices and the orders of dimension n.

Many partial orders arise from (and thus can be represented by) collections of geometric objects. Among them are the n-ball orders. The 1-ball orders are the interval-containment orders, and the 2-ball orders are the so-called circle orders—the posets representable in terms of containment among disks in the plane. A particularly nice result in this field is the characterization of the planar graphs, as those graphs whose vertex-edge incidence relations are circle orders.

There are also geometric representations that are not based on inclusion. Indeed, one of the best studied classes among these are the interval orders, which represent the partial order in terms of what might be called disjoint precedence of intervals on the real line: each element x of the poset is represented by an interval [x_{1}, x_{2}], such that for any y and z in the poset, y is below z if and only if y_{2} < z_{1}.

=== Logic ===
In logic, the representability of algebras as relational structures is often used to prove the equivalence of algebraic and relational semantics. Examples of this include Stone's representation of Boolean algebras as fields of sets, Esakia's representation of Heyting algebras as Heyting algebras of sets, and the study of representable relation algebras and representable cylindric algebras.

=== Polysemy ===
Under certain circumstances, a single function f : X → Y is at once an isomorphism from several mathematical structures on X. Since each of those structures may be thought of, intuitively, as a meaning of the image Y (one of the things that Y is trying to tell us), this phenomenon is called polysemy—a term borrowed from linguistics. Some examples of polysemy include:

- intersection polysemy—pairs of graphs G_{1} and G_{2} on a common vertex set V that can be simultaneously represented by a single collection of sets S_{v}, such that any distinct vertices u and w in V are adjacent in G_{1}, if and only if their corresponding sets intersect ( S_{u} ∩ S_{w} ≠ Ø ), and are adjacent in G_{2} if and only if the complements do ( S_{u}^{C} ∩ S_{w}^{C} ≠ Ø ).
- competition polysemy—motivated by the study of ecological food webs, in which pairs of species may have prey in common or have predators in common. A pair of graphs G_{1} and G_{2} on one vertex set is competition polysemic, if and only if there exists a single directed graph D on the same vertex set, such that any distinct vertices u and v are adjacent in G_{1,} if and only if there is a vertex w such that both uw and vw are arcs in D, and are adjacent in G_{2,} if and only if there is a vertex w such that both wu and wv are arcs in D.
- interval polysemy—pairs of posets P_{1} and P_{2} on a common ground set that can be simultaneously represented by a single collection of real intervals, that is an interval-order representation of P_{1} and an interval-containment representation of P_{2}.

== See also ==
- Group representation
- Representation theorems
- Model theory
