= Cyclically ordered group =

Group with a cyclic order respected by the group operation

In mathematics, a cyclically ordered group is a set with both a group structure and a cyclic order, such that left and right multiplication both preserve the cyclic order.

Cyclically ordered groups were first studied in depth by Ladislav Rieger in 1947. They are a generalization of cyclic groups: the infinite cyclic group Z and the finite cyclic groups Z/n. Since a linear order induces a cyclic order, cyclically ordered groups are also a generalization of linearly ordered groups: the rational numbers Q, the real numbers R, and so on. Some of the most important cyclically ordered groups fall into neither previous category: the circle group T and its subgroups, such as the subgroup of rational points.

== Quotients of linear groups ==
It is natural to depict cyclically ordered groups as quotients: one has Z_{n} = Z/nZ and T = R/Z. Even a once-linear group like Z, when bent into a circle, can be thought of as Z^{2} / Z. Rieger (1946, 1947, 1948) showed that this picture is a generic phenomenon. For any ordered group L and any central element z that generates a cofinal subgroup Z of L, the quotient group L / Z is a cyclically ordered group. Moreover, every cyclically ordered group can be expressed as such a quotient group.

== The circle group ==
Świerczkowski (1959a) built upon Rieger's results in another direction. Given a cyclically ordered group K and an ordered group L, the product K × L is a cyclically ordered group. In particular, if T is the circle group and L is an ordered group, then any subgroup of T × L is a cyclically ordered group. Moreover, every cyclically ordered group can be expressed as a subgroup of such a product with T.

By analogy with an Archimedean linearly ordered group, one can define an Archimedean cyclically ordered group as a group that does not contain any pair of elements x, y such that [e, x^{n}, y] for every positive integer n. Since only positive n are considered, this is a stronger condition than its linear counterpart. For example, Z no longer qualifies, since one has [0, n, −1] for every n.

As a corollary to Świerczkowski's proof, every Archimedean cyclically ordered group is a subgroup of T itself. This result is analogous to Otto Hölder's 1901 theorem that every Archimedean linearly ordered group is a subgroup of R.

== Topology ==
Every compact cyclically ordered group is a subgroup of T.

== Related structures ==
Gluschankof (1993) showed that a certain subcategory of cyclically ordered groups, the "projectable Ic-groups with weak unit", is equivalent to a certain subcategory of MV-algebras, the "projectable MV-algebras".
