= Separation relation =

A separation relation may refer to

- Betweenness relation
- Point-pair separation in a cycle
- Separation axioms in point-set topology, or
- Arm's length principle
