= Cyclic category =

In mathematics, the cyclic category or cycle category or category of cycles is a category of finite cyclically ordered sets and degree-1 maps between them. It was introduced by Connes (1983).

== Definition ==
The cyclic category Λ has one object Λ_{n} for each natural number n = 0, 1, 2, ...

The morphisms from Λ_{m} to Λ_{n} are represented by increasing functions f from the integers to the integers, such that f(x+m+1) = f(x)+n+1, where two functions f and g represent the same morphism when their difference is divisible by n+1.

Informally, the morphisms from Λ_{m} to Λ_{n} can be thought of as maps of (oriented) necklaces with m+1 and n+1 beads. More precisely, the morphisms can be identified with homotopy classes of degree 1 increasing maps from S^{1} to itself that map the subgroup Z/(m+1)Z to Z/(n+1)Z.

== Properties ==
The number of morphisms from Λ_{m} to Λ_{n} is (m+n+1)!/m!n!.

The cyclic category is self dual.

The classifying space BΛ of the cyclic category is a classifying space BS^{1}of the circle group S^{1}.

== Cyclic sets ==
A cyclic set is a contravariant functor from the cyclic category to sets. More generally a cyclic object in a category C is a contravariant functor from the cyclic category to C.

== See also ==
- Cyclic homology
- Simplex category
