= Esakia space =

In mathematics, Esakia spaces are special ordered topological spaces introduced and studied by Leo Esakia in 1974. Esakia spaces play a fundamental role in the study of Heyting algebras, primarily by virtue of the Esakia duality—the dual equivalence between the category of Heyting algebras and the category of Esakia spaces.

== Definition ==
For a partially ordered set (X, ≤) and for x∈ X, let ↓x = {y∈ X : y≤ x} and let ↑x = {y∈ X : x≤ y}. Also, for A⊆ X, let ↓A = {y∈ X : y ≤ x for some x∈ A} and ↑A = {y∈ X : y≥ x for some x∈ A}.

An Esakia space is a Priestley space (X,τ,≤) such that for each clopen subset C of the topological space (X,τ), the set ↓C is also clopen.

== Equivalent definitions ==
There are several equivalent ways to define Esakia spaces.

Theorem: Given that (X,τ) is a Stone space, the following conditions are equivalent:

(i) (X,τ,≤) is an Esakia space.

(ii) ↑x is closed for each x∈ X and ↓C is clopen for each clopen C⊆ X.

(iii) ↓x is closed for each x∈ X and ↑cl(A) = cl(↑A) for each A⊆ X (where cl denotes the closure in X).

(iv) ↓x is closed for each x∈ X, the least closed set containing an up-set is an up-set, and the least up-set containing a closed set is closed.

Since Priestley spaces can be described in terms of spectral spaces, the Esakia property can be expressed in spectral space terminology as follows: The Priestley space corresponding to a spectral space X is an Esakia space if and only if the closure of every constructible subset of X is constructible.

== Esakia morphisms ==
Let (X,≤) and (Y,≤) be partially ordered sets and let f : X → Y be an order-preserving map. The map f is a bounded morphism (also known as p-morphism) if for each x∈ X and y∈ Y, if f(x)≤ y, then there exists z∈ X such that x≤ z and f(z) = y.

Theorem: The following conditions are equivalent:

(1) f is a bounded morphism.

(2) f(↑x) = ↑f(x) for each x∈ X.

(3) f^{−1}(↓y) = ↓f^{−1}(y) for each y∈ Y.

Let (X, τ, ≤) and (Y, τ′, ≤) be Esakia spaces and let f : X → Y be a map. The map f is called an Esakia morphism if f is a continuous bounded morphism.
