= Archimedean group =

Type of classification in algebra

In abstract algebra, a branch of mathematics, an Archimedean group is a linearly ordered group for which the Archimedean property holds: every two positive group elements are bounded by integer multiples of each other. The set R of real numbers together with the operation of addition and the usual ordering relation between pairs of numbers is an Archimedean group. By a result of Otto Hölder, every Archimedean group is isomorphic to a subgroup of this group. The name "Archimedean" comes from Otto Stolz, who named the Archimedean property after its appearance in the works of Archimedes.

== Definition ==
An additive group consists of a set of elements, an associative addition operation that combines pairs of elements and returns a single element, an identity element (or zero element) whose sum with any other element is the other element, and an additive inverse operation such that the sum of any element and its inverse is zero. A group is a linearly ordered group when, in addition, its elements can be linearly ordered in a way that is compatible with the group operation: for all elements x, y, and z, if x ≤ y then x + z ≤ y + z and z + x ≤ z + y.

The notation na (where n is a natural number) stands for the group sum of n copies of a. An Archimedean group (G, +, ≤) is a linearly ordered group subject to the following additional condition, the Archimedean property: For every a and b in G which are greater than 0, it is possible to find a natural number n for which the inequality b ≤ na holds.

An equivalent definition is that an Archimedean group is a linearly ordered group without any bounded cyclic subgroups: there does not exist a cyclic subgroup S and an element x with x greater than all elements in S. It is straightforward to see that this is equivalent to the other definition: the Archimedean property for a pair of elements a and b is just the statement that the cyclic subgroup generated by a is not bounded by b.

== Examples of Archimedean groups ==
The sets of the integers, the rational numbers, and the real numbers, together with the operation of addition and the usual ordering (≤), are Archimedean groups. Every subgroup of an Archimedean group is itself Archimedean, so it follows that every subgroup of these groups, such as the additive group of the even numbers or of the dyadic rationals, also forms an Archimedean group.

Conversely, as Otto Hölder showed, every Archimedean group is isomorphic (as an ordered group) to a subgroup of the real numbers. It follows from this that every Archimedean group is necessarily an abelian group: its addition operation must be commutative.

== Examples of non-Archimedean groups ==
Groups that cannot be linearly ordered, such as the finite groups, are not Archimedean. For another example, see the p-adic numbers, a system of numbers generalizing the rational numbers in a different way to the real numbers.

Non-Archimedean ordered groups also exist; the ordered group (G, +, ≤) defined as follows is not Archimedean. Let the elements of G be the points of the Euclidean plane, given by their Cartesian coordinates: pairs (x, y) of real numbers. Let the group addition operation be pointwise (vector) addition, and order these points in lexicographic order: if a = (u, v) and b = (x, y), then a + b = (u + x, v + y), and a ≤ b exactly when either v < y or v = y and u ≤ x. Then this gives an ordered group, but one that is not Archimedean. To see this, consider the elements (1, 0) and (0, 1), both of which are greater than the zero element of the group (the origin). For every natural number n, it follows from these definitions that n(1, 0) = (n, 0) < (0, 1), so there is no n that satisfies the Archimedean property. This group can be thought of as the additive group of pairs of a real number and an infinitesimal, $(x, y) = x \epsilon + y,$ where $\epsilon$ is a unit infinitesimal: $\epsilon > 0$ but $\epsilon < y$ for any positive real number $y > 0$. Non-Archimedean ordered fields can be defined similarly, and their additive groups are non-Archimedean ordered groups. These are used in non-standard analysis, and include the hyperreal numbers and surreal numbers.

While non-Archimedean ordered groups cannot be embedded in the real numbers, they can be embedded in a power of the real numbers, with lexicographic order, by the Hahn embedding theorem; the example above is the 2-dimensional case.

== Additional properties ==
Every Archimedean group has the property that, for every Dedekind cut of the group, and every group element ε > 0, there exists another group element x with x on the lower side of the cut and x + ε on the upper side of the cut. However, there exist non-Archimedean ordered groups with the same property. The fact that Archimedean groups are abelian can be generalized: every ordered group with this property is abelian.

== Generalisations ==
Archimedean groups can be generalised to Archimedean monoids, linearly ordered monoids that obey the Archimedean property. Examples include the natural numbers, the non-negative rational numbers, and the non-negative real numbers, with the usual binary operation $+$ and order $<$. Through a similar proof as for Archimedean groups, Archimedean monoids can be shown to be commutative.

== See also ==
- Archimedean equivalence
