= Hahn embedding theorem =

Description of linearly ordered groups

In mathematics, especially in the area of abstract algebra dealing with ordered structures on abelian groups, the Hahn embedding theorem gives a simple description of all linearly ordered abelian groups. It is named after Hans Hahn.

== Overview ==
The theorem states that every linearly ordered abelian group G can be embedded as an ordered subgroup of the additive group $\mathbb{R}^\Omega$ endowed with a lexicographical order, where $\mathbb{R}$ is the additive group of real numbers (with its standard order), Ω is the set of Archimedean equivalence classes of G, and $\mathbb{R}^\Omega$ is the set of all functions from Ω to $\mathbb{R}$ which vanish outside a well-ordered set.

Let 0 denote the identity element of G. For any nonzero element g of G, exactly one of the elements g or −g is greater than 0; denote this element by |g|. Two nonzero elements g and h of G are Archimedean equivalent if there exist natural numbers N and M such that N|g| > |h| and M|h| > |g|. Intuitively, this means that neither g nor h is "infinitesimal" with respect to the other. The group G is Archimedean if all nonzero elements are Archimedean-equivalent. In this case, Ω is a singleton, so $\mathbb{R}^\Omega$ is just the group of real numbers. Then Hahn's Embedding Theorem reduces to Hölder's theorem, which states that a linearly ordered abelian group is Archimedean if and only if it is a subgroup of the ordered additive group of the real numbers.

Gravett (1956) gives a clear statement and proof of the theorem. The papers of Clifford (1954) and Hausner & Wendel (1952) together provide another proof. See also Fuchs & Salce (2001, p. 62).

== See also ==
- Archimedean group
- Holland's embedding theorem
