= Inclusion order =

Partial order that arises as the subset-inclusion relation on some collection of objects

In the mathematical field of order theory, an inclusion order is the partial order that arises as the subset-inclusion relation on some collection of objects. In a simple way, every poset P = (X,≤) is (isomorphic to) an inclusion order (just as every group is isomorphic to a permutation group – see Cayley's theorem). To see this, associate to each element x of X the set

$$X_{\leq(x)} = \{ y \in X \mid y \leq x\} ;$$

then the transitivity of ≤ ensures that for all a and b in X, we have

$$X_{\leq(a)} \subseteq X_{\leq(b)} \text{ precisely when } a \leq b .$$

There can be sets $S$ of cardinality less than $|X|$ such that P is isomorphic to the inclusion order on S. The size of the smallest possible S is called the 2-dimension of P.

Several important classes of poset arise as inclusion orders for some natural collections, like the Boolean lattice Q^{n}, which is the collection of all 2^{n} subsets of an n-element set, the interval-containment orders, which are precisely the orders of order dimension at most two, and the dimension-n orders, which are the containment orders on collections of n-boxes anchored at the origin. Other containment orders that are interesting in their own right include the circle orders, which arise from disks in the plane, and the angle orders.

== See also ==
- Birkhoff's representation theorem
- Intersection graph
- Interval order
