= Holland's embedding theorem =

Theorem in lattice-ordered group theory

Holland's embedding theorem is a representation theorem in the theory of lattice-ordered groups. It states that every lattice-ordered group can be embedded, with its lattice operations preserved, in the lattice-ordered group of all order-preserving bijections of a totally ordered set. It is the lattice-ordered analogue of Cayley's theorem in group theory, and was proved by Wilbur Charles Holland in 1963.

Holland's embedding theorem is the foundation of the study of the groups of order-preserving permutations of chains, known as ordered permutation groups, which have been investigated in their own right ever since.

== Notation ==
A lattice-ordered group (written ℓ-group, with a script ell; older sources use l-group) is a group G together with a lattice order ≤ that is preserved by multiplication: a ≤ b implies ca ≤ cb and ac ≤ bc for all a, b, c ∈ G. Throughout, Ω denotes a totally ordered set (a chain), Aut(Ω) denotes the group of all order-preserving bijections from Ω to Ω, and ≤ on Aut(Ω) is the pointwise order: f ≤ g when f(x) ≤ g(x) for every x ∈ Ω. The lattice operations on Aut(Ω) are the pointwise meet and join, written ∧ and ∨. Holland's 1963 paper writes L where the 2011 survey writes Ω; the two letters denote the same object.

== Statement ==
The group Aut(Ω), ordered pointwise, is itself an ℓ-group: the meet (f ∧ g)(x) = min{f(x), g(x)} and the join (f ∨ g)(x) = max{f(x), g(x)} are again order-preserving bijections.

Holland's embedding theorem states that for every ℓ-group G there is a totally ordered set Ω such that G admits an injective homomorphism of ℓ-groups into Aut(Ω). In other words, every lattice-ordered group can be realised as a group of order-preserving permutations of a chain, with its order and lattice operations computed pointwise.

The chain Ω cannot in general be taken to be the underlying lattice of G, since that lattice need not be totally ordered; a separate chain must be constructed.

== Construction ==
The proof builds the chain from the convex ℓ-subgroups of G. For g ≠ 1, Zorn's lemma gives a convex ℓ-subgroup C[g] maximal among those that do not contain g; the convex ℓ-subgroups containing it form a chain under inclusion, so the right cosets R(C[g]) are totally ordered by Cx ≤ Cy when cx ≤ y for some c ∈ C. Each element of G acts on these cosets by right multiplication, and the resulting map is an ℓ-group homomorphism onto a transitive ℓ-subgroup. Applied to every g ≠ 1, this embeds G as a subdirect sum of such transitive permutation groups; ordering the union of the coset chains lexicographically, each chain as a block, gives a single chain on which G acts faithfully with its lattice operations preserved.

Right cosets of a convex ℓ-subgroup C, totally ordered; each g ∈ G permutes them by right multiplication

The transitive pieces, ordered lexicographically as blocks, form a single chain Ω

== Ordered permutation groups ==
The group Aut(Ω) of all order-preserving permutations of a chain Ω, ordered pointwise, is itself an ℓ-group, and its subgroups are natural sources of further examples. A pair (G, Ω), where G is a subgroup of Aut(Ω) with the induced order, is called an ordered permutation group; when G is closed under the lattice operations of Aut(Ω) it is a lattice-ordered permutation group.

If Ω is finite, Aut(Ω) is trivial: the only order-preserving bijection of a finite chain is the identity. The groups Aut(Ω) are therefore interesting only for infinite chains, and the principal examples are the automorphism groups of dense orders such as the real line and the rational numbers, ordered pointwise. Holland's 1963 paper determined the convex normal sublattice subgroups of the automorphism group of the real line. Holland also showed, assuming the generalised continuum hypothesis, that every ℓ-group can be embedded in a divisible ℓ-group; the assumption was later removed. The automorphism groups of chains have also been used in the study of the word problem for ℓ-groups.

Translations by a_{i} ↑ √2 on ℝ and on ℚ: the supremum is x + √2, a bijection of ℝ but not of ℚ

== History ==
Holland's embedding theorem was published in 1963 in the Michigan Mathematical Journal. The paper presents it as a partial answer to Problem 95 of Garrett Birkhoff's Lattice Theory (1948), which asks: "Characterize abstractly, as groups, as lattices, and as l-groups, the l-groups of all lattice-automorphisms of a general chain". Holland took up the problem in 1962–63, while he was at the University of Tübingen with Helmut Wielandt. The groups Aut(Ω) and their subgroups have been studied continuously since, including work on wreath products of ordered permutation groups, closed subgroups of lattice-ordered permutation groups, and the reconstruction of a chain from the first-order theory of its automorphism group. A retrospective survey of the subject appeared in 2011, in the same issue as a tribute marking Holland's 75th birthday.

== See also ==
- Partially ordered group
- Automorphism group
- Permutation group
- Total order
- Cayley's theorem
- Hahn embedding theorem
