= Countryman line =

In mathematics, a Countryman line (named after Roger Simmons Countryman Jr.) is an uncountable linear ordering whose square is the union of countably many chains. The existence of Countryman lines was first proven by Shelah, who credited the problem to an unpublished preprint of Countryman.

Shelah also conjectured that, assuming the proper forcing axiom, every Aronszajn line contains a Countryman line. This conjecture, which remained open for three decades, was proven by Justin Moore.
