= Invariant factorization of LPDOs =

The factorization of a linear partial differential operator (LPDO) is an important issue in the theory of integrability, due to the Laplace-Darboux transformations, which allow construction of integrable LPDEs. Laplace solved the factorization problem for a bivariate hyperbolic operator of the second order (see Hyperbolic partial differential equation), constructing two Laplace invariants. Each Laplace invariant is an explicit polynomial condition of factorization; coefficients of this polynomial are explicit functions of the coefficients of the initial LPDO. The polynomial conditions of factorization are called invariants because they have the same form for equivalent (i.e. self-adjoint) operators.

Beals-Kartashova-factorization (also called BK-factorization) is a constructive procedure to factorize a bivariate operator of the arbitrary order and arbitrary form. Correspondingly, the factorization conditions in this case also have polynomial form, are invariants and coincide with Laplace invariants for bivariate hyperbolic operators of the second order. The factorization procedure is purely algebraic, the number of possible factorizations depending on the number of simple roots of the Characteristic polynomial (also called symbol) of the initial LPDO and reduced LPDOs appearing at each factorization step. Below the factorization procedure is described for a bivariate operator of arbitrary form, of order 2 and 3. Explicit factorization formulas for an operator of the order $n$ can be found in General invariants are defined in and invariant formulation of the Beals-Kartashova factorization is given in

== Beals-Kartashova Factorization ==
=== Operator of order 2 ===
Consider an operator

$$\mathcal{A}_2 = a_{20}\partial_x^2 + a_{11}\partial_x\partial_y + a_{02}\partial_y^2+a_{10}\partial_x+a_{01}\partial_y+a_{00}.$$

with smooth coefficients and look for a factorization

$$\mathcal{A}_2=(p_1\partial_x+p_2\partial_y+p_3)(p_4\partial_x+p_5\partial_y+p_6).$$

Let us write down the equations on $p_i$ explicitly, keeping in mind the rule of left composition, i.e. that

$$\partial_x (\alpha
\partial_y) = \partial_x (\alpha) \partial_y +
\alpha \partial_{xy}.$$

Then in all cases

$$a_{20} =  p_1p_4,$$

$$a_{11} =  p_2p_4+p_1p_5,$$

$$a_{02} =  p_2p_5,$$

$$a_{10} =  \mathcal{L}(p_4) + p_3p_4+p_1p_6,$$

$$a_{01} =  \mathcal{L}(p_5) + p_3p_5+p_2p_6,$$

$$a_{00} =  \mathcal{L}(p_6) + p_3p_6,$$

where the notation $\mathcal{L} = p_1 \partial_x + p_2 \partial_y$ is used.

Without loss of generality, $a_{20}\ne 0,$ i.e. $p_1\ne 0,$ and it can be taken as 1, $p_1 = 1.$ Now solution of the system of 6 equations on the variables

$p_2,$ $...$ $p_6$

can be found in three steps.

At the first step, the roots of a quadratic polynomial have to be found.

At the second step, a linear system of two algebraic equations has to be solved.

At the third step, one algebraic condition has to be checked.

Step 1. Variables

$p_2,$ $p_4,$ $p_5$

can be found from the first three equations,

$$a_{20} =  p_1p_4,$$

$$a_{11} =  p_2p_4+p_1p_5,$$

$$a_{02} =  p_2p_5.$$

The (possible) solutions are then the functions of the roots of a quadratic polynomial:

$$\mathcal{P}_2(-p_2) =  a_{20}(- p_2)^2 +a_{11}(- p_2) +a_{02} = 0$$

Let $\omega$ be a root of the polynomial $\mathcal{P}_2,$ then

$$p_1=1,$$
$$p_2=-\omega,$$
$$p_4=a_{20},$$
$$p_5=a_{20} \omega +a_{11},$$

Step 2. Substitution of the results obtained at the first step, into the next two equations

$$a_{10} =  \mathcal{L}(p_4) + p_3p_4+p_1p_6,$$

$$a_{01} =  \mathcal{L}(p_5) + p_3p_5+p_2p_6,$$

yields linear system of two algebraic equations:

$$a_{10} =  \mathcal{L} a_{20} +p_3 a_{20} +p_6,$$
$$a_{01} =  \mathcal{L}(a_{11}+a_{20} \omega)+p_3( a_{11} + a_{20}\omega)-
\omega p_6.,$$

In particularly, if the root $\omega$ is simple, i.e.

$\mathcal{P}_2'(\omega)=2a_{20}\omega+a_{11}\ne 0,$ then these

equations have the unique solution:

$$p_3 =  \frac{\omega a_{10}+a_{01} -\omega\mathcal{L}a_{20}- \mathcal{L}(a_{20} \omega+a_{11})}
{2a_{20}\omega+a_{11}},$$
$$p_6 =\frac{ (a_{20}\omega+a_{11})(a_{10}-\mathcal{L}a_{20})-a_{20}(a_{01}
-\mathcal{L}(a_{20}\omega+a_{11}))}{2a_{20}\omega+a_{11}}.$$

At this step, for each root of the polynomial $\mathcal{P}_2$ a corresponding set of coefficients $p_j$ is computed.

Step 3. Check factorization condition (which is the last of the initial 6 equations)

$$a_{00} =  \mathcal{L}(p_6)+p_3p_6,$$

written in the known variables $p_j$ and $\omega$):

$$a_{00} = \mathcal{L} \left\{
\frac{\omega a_{10}+a_{01} - \mathcal{L}(2a_{20} \omega+a_{11})}
{2a_{20}\omega+a_{11}}\right\}+ \frac{\omega a_{10}+a_{01} -
\mathcal{L}(2a_{20} \omega+a_{11})}
{2a_{20}\omega+a_{11}}\times
\frac{ a_{20}(a_{01}-\mathcal{L}(a_{20}\omega+a_{11}))+
(a_{20}\omega+a_{11})(a_{10}-\mathcal{L}a_{20})}{2a_{20}\omega+a_{11}}$$

If

$$l_2= a_{00} - \mathcal{L} \left\{
\frac{\omega a_{10}+a_{01} - \mathcal{L}(2a_{20} \omega+a_{11})}
{2a_{20}\omega+a_{11}}\right\}+ \frac{\omega a_{10}+a_{01} -
\mathcal{L}(2a_{20} \omega+a_{11})}
{2a_{20}\omega+a_{11}}\times
\frac{ a_{20}(a_{01}-\mathcal{L}(a_{20}\omega+a_{11}))+
(a_{20}\omega+a_{11})(a_{10}-\mathcal{L}a_{20})}{2a_{20}\omega+a_{11}} =0,$$

the operator $\mathcal{A}_2$ is factorizable and explicit form for the factorization coefficients $p_j$ is given above.

=== Operator of order 3 ===
Consider an operator

$$\mathcal{A}_3=\sum_{j+k\le3}a_{jk}\partial_x^j\partial_y^k =a_{30}\partial_x^3 +
a_{21}\partial_x^2 \partial_y + a_{12}\partial_x \partial_y^2 +a_{03}\partial_y^3 +
a_{20}\partial_x^2+a_{11}\partial_x\partial_y+a_{02}\partial_y^2+a_{10}\partial_x+a_{01}\partial_y+a_{00}.$$

with smooth coefficients and look for a factorization

$$\mathcal{A}_3=(p_1\partial_x+p_2\partial_y+p_3)(p_4 \partial_x^2 +p_5 \partial_x\partial_y  + p_6 \partial_y^2 + p_7
\partial_x + p_8 \partial_y + p_9).$$

Similar to the case of the operator $\mathcal{A}_2,$ the conditions of factorization are described by the following system:

$$a_{30} =  p_1p_4,$$

$$a_{21} =  p_2p_4+p_1p_5,$$

$$a_{12} =  p_2p_5+p_1p_6,$$

$$a_{03} =  p_2p_6,$$

$$a_{20} =  \mathcal{L}(p_4)+p_3p_4+p_1p_7,$$

$$a_{11} =  \mathcal{L}(p_5)+p_3p_5+p_2p_7+p_1p_8,$$

$$a_{02} =  \mathcal{L}(p_6)+p_3p_6+p_2p_8,$$

$$a_{10} =  \mathcal{L}(p_7)+p_3p_7+p_1p_9,$$

$$a_{01} =  \mathcal{L}(p_8)+p_3p_8+p_2p_9,$$

$$a_{00} =  \mathcal{L}(p_9)+p_3p_9,$$

with $\mathcal{L} = p_1 \partial_x + p_2 \partial_y,$ and again $a_{30}\ne 0,$ i.e. $p_1=1,$ and three-step procedure yields:

At the first step, the roots of a cubic polynomial

$$\mathcal{P}_3(-p_2):=  a_{30}(-p_2)^3 +a_{21}(- p_2)^2 +
a_{12}(-p_2)+a_{03}=0.$$

have to be found. Again $\omega$ denotes a root and first four coefficients are

$$p_1=1,$$
$$p_2=-\omega,$$
$$p_4=a_{30},$$
$$p_5=a_{30} \omega+a_{21},$$
$$p_6=a_{30}\omega^2+a_{21}\omega+a_{12}.$$

At the second step, a linear system of three algebraic equations has to be solved:

$$a_{20}-\mathcal{L} a_{30} = p_3 a_{30} +p_7,$$
$$a_{11}-\mathcal{L}(a_{30} \omega + a_{21}) = p_3(a_{30}\omega+a_{21})- \omega p_7+p_8,$$
$$a_{02}-\mathcal{L}(a_{30}\omega^2+a_{21}\omega+a_{12})= p_3 (a_{30}\omega^2+a_{21}\omega+a_{12})-\omega p_8.$$

At the third step, two algebraic conditions have to be checked.

== Invariant Formulation ==
Definition The operators $\mathcal{A}$, $\tilde{\mathcal{A}}$ are called equivalent if there is a gauge transformation that takes one to the other:

$$\tilde{\mathcal{A}} g= e^{-\varphi}\mathcal{A} (e^{\varphi}g).$$

BK-factorization is then pure algebraic procedure which allows to construct explicitly a factorization of an arbitrary order LPDO $\tilde{\mathcal{A}}$ in the form

$$\mathcal{A}=\sum_{j+k\le n}a_{jk}\partial_x^j\partial_y^k=\mathcal{L}\circ
\sum_{j+k\le (n-1)}p_{jk}\partial_x^j\partial_y^k$$

with first-order operator $\mathcal{L}=\partial_x-\omega\partial_y+p$ where $\omega$ is an arbitrary simple root of the characteristic polynomial

$$\mathcal{P}(t)=\sum^n_{k=0}a_{n-k,k}t^{n-k}, \quad
\mathcal{P}(\omega)=0.$$

Factorization is possible then for each simple root $\tilde{\omega}$ iff

for $n=2 \ \ \rightarrow l_2=0,$

for $n=3 \ \ \rightarrow l_3=0, l_{31}=0,$

for $n=4 \ \ \rightarrow l_4=0, l_{41}=0, l_{42}=0,$

and so on. All functions $l_2, l_3, l_{31}, l_4, l_{41}, \ \ l_{42}, ...$ are known functions, for instance,

$$l_2= a_{00} - \mathcal{L}(p_6)+p_3p_6,$$

$$l_3= a_{00} - \mathcal{L}(p_9)+p_3p_9,$$

$$l_{31} = a_{01} -  \mathcal{L}(p_8)+p_3p_8+p_2p_9,$$

and so on.

Theorem All functions

$$l_2= a_{00} - \mathcal{L}(p_6)+p_3p_6,
l_3= a_{00} - \mathcal{L}(p_9)+p_3p_9,
l_{31}, ....$$

are invariants under gauge transformations.

Definition Invariants $l_2= a_{00} - \mathcal{L}(p_6)+p_3p_6, l_3= a_{00} - \mathcal{L}(p_9)+p_3p_9, l_{31}, .... .$ are called generalized invariants of a bivariate operator of arbitrary order.

In particular case of the bivariate hyperbolic operator its generalized invariants coincide with Laplace invariants (see Laplace invariant).

Corollary If an operator $\tilde{\mathcal{A}}$ is factorizable, then all operators equivalent to it, are also factorizable.

Equivalent operators are easy to compute:

$$e^{-\varphi} \partial_x e^{\varphi}= \partial_x+\varphi_x, \quad e^{-\varphi}\partial_y e^{\varphi}=
\partial_y+\varphi_y,$$

$$e^{-\varphi} \partial_x \partial_y e^{\varphi}= e^{-\varphi} \partial_x e^{\varphi}
e^{-\varphi} \partial_y e^{\varphi}=(\partial_x+\varphi_x) \circ (\partial_y+\varphi_y)$$

and so on. Some example are given below:

$$A_1=\partial_x \partial_y + x\partial_x + 1= \partial_x(\partial_y+x), \quad
l_2(A_1)=1-1-0=0;$$

$$A_2=\partial_x \partial_y + x\partial_x + \partial_y +x + 1, \quad
A_2=e^{-x}A_1e^{x};\quad l_2(A_2)=(x+1)-1-x=0;$$

$$A_3=\partial_x \partial_y + 2x\partial_x + (y+1)\partial_y +2(xy +x+1), \quad
A_3=e^{-xy}A_2e^{xy}; \quad l_2(A_3)=2(x+1+xy)-2-2x(y+1)=0;$$

$$A_4=\partial_x \partial_y +x\partial_x + (\cos x +1) \partial_y + x \cos x +x +1, \quad
A_4=e^{-\sin x}A_2e^{\sin x}; \quad l_2(A_4)=0.$$

== Transpose ==
Factorization of an operator is the first step on the way of solving corresponding equation. But for solution we need right factors and BK-factorization constructs left factors which are easy to construct. On the other hand, the existence of a certain right factor of a LPDO is equivalent to the existence of a corresponding left factor of the transpose of that operator.

Definition The transpose $\mathcal{A}^t$ of an operator $\mathcal{A}=\sum a_{\alpha}\partial^{\alpha},\qquad \partial^{\alpha}=\partial_1^{\alpha_1}\cdots\partial_n^{\alpha_n}.$ is defined as $\mathcal{A}^t u = \sum (-1)^{|\alpha|}\partial^\alpha(a_\alpha u).$ and the identity $\partial^\gamma(uv)=\sum \binom\gamma\alpha \partial^\alpha u,\partial^{\gamma-\alpha}v$ implies that $\mathcal{A}^t=\sum (-1)^{|\alpha+\beta|}\binom{\alpha+\beta}\alpha (\partial^\beta a_{\alpha+\beta})\partial^\alpha.$

Now the coefficients are

$\mathcal{A}^t=\sum \tilde{a}_{\alpha} \partial^{\alpha},$ $\tilde{a}_{\alpha}=\sum (-1)^{|\alpha+\beta|} \binom{\alpha+\beta}{\alpha}\partial^\beta(a_{\alpha+\beta}).$

with a standard convention for binomial coefficients in several variables (see Binomial coefficient), e.g. in two variables

$$\binom\alpha\beta=\binom{(\alpha_1,\alpha_2)}{(\beta_1,\beta_2)}=\binom{\alpha_1}{\beta_1}\,\binom{\alpha_2}{\beta_2}.$$

In particular, for the operator $\mathcal{A}_2$ the coefficients are $\tilde{a}_{jk}=a_{jk},\quad j+k=2; \tilde{a}_{10}=-a_{10}+2\partial_x a_{20}+\partial_y a_{11}, \tilde{a}_{01}=-a_{01}+\partial_x a_{11}+2\partial_y a_{02},$

$$\tilde{a}_{00}=a_{00}-\partial_x a_{10}-\partial_y a_{01}+\partial_x^2 a_{20}+\partial_x \partial_x
a_{11}+\partial_y^2 a_{02}.$$

For instance, the operator

$$\partial_{xx}-\partial_{yy}+y\partial_x+x\partial_y+\frac{1}{4}(y^2-x^2)-1$$

is factorizable as

$$\big[\partial_x+\partial_y+\tfrac12(y-x)\big]\,\big[...\big]$$

and its transpose $\mathcal{A}_1^t$ is factorizable then as $\big[...\big]\,\big[\partial_x-\partial_y+\tfrac12(y+x)\big].$

== See also ==
- Partial derivative
- Invariant (mathematics)
- Invariant theory
- Characteristic polynomial
