= Laplace invariant =

Measures coefficients, derivatives in second-order hyperbolic differential equations

In differential equations, the Laplace invariant of any of certain differential operators is a certain function of the coefficients and their derivatives. Consider a bivariate hyperbolic differential operator of the second order

$$\partial_x \, \partial_y + a\,\partial_x + b\,\partial_y + c, \,$$

whose coefficients

$$a=a(x,y), \ \ b=c(x,y), \ \ c=c(x,y),$$

are smooth functions of two variables. Its Laplace invariants have the form

$$\hat{a}= c- ab -a_x \quad \text{and} \quad \hat{b}=c- ab  -b_y.$$

Their importance is due to the classical theorem:

Theorem: Two operators of the form are equivalent under gauge transformations if and only if their Laplace invariants coincide pairwise.

Here the operators

$$A \quad \text{and} \quad \tilde A$$

are called equivalent if there is a gauge transformation that takes one to the other:

$$\tilde Ag= e^{-\varphi}A(e^{\varphi}g)\equiv A_\varphi g.$$

Laplace invariants can be regarded as factorization "remainders" for the initial operator A:

$$\partial_x\, \partial_y + a\,\partial_x + b\,\partial_y + c = \left\{\begin{array}{c}
(\partial_x + b)(\partial_y + a) - ab - a_x + c ,\\
(\partial_y + a)(\partial_x + b) - ab - b_y + c .
\end{array}\right.$$

If at least one of Laplace invariants is not equal to zero, i.e.

$$c- ab -a_x \neq 0 \quad \text{and/or} \quad
c- ab  -b_y  \neq 0,$$

then this representation is a first step of the Laplace–Darboux transformations used for solving non-factorizable bivariate linear partial differential equations (LPDEs).

If both Laplace invariants are equal to zero, i.e.

$$c- ab -a_x=0 \quad \text{and} \quad
c- ab  -b_y =0,$$

then the differential operator A is factorizable and corresponding linear partial differential equation of second order is solvable.

Laplace invariants have been introduced for a bivariate linear partial differential operator (LPDO) of order 2 and of hyperbolic type. They are a particular case of generalized invariants which can be constructed for a bivariate LPDO of arbitrary order and arbitrary type; see Invariant factorization of LPDOs.

== See also ==
- Partial derivative
- Invariant (mathematics)
- Invariant theory
