= Giovanni Vailati =

Italian philosopher and mathematician (1863–1909)

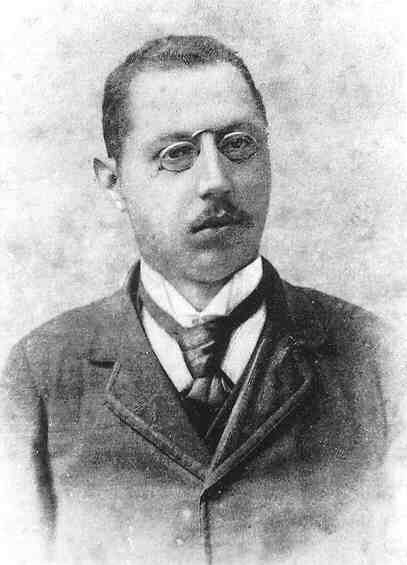
- Born: April 24, 1863; Crema, Kingdom of Italy
- Died: May 14, 1909 (aged 46); Rome, Kingdom of Italy
- Education: University of Turin
- Known for: Italian pragmatism
- Scientific career
- Fields: Mathematics, philosophy
- Workplaces: University of Turin

Giovanni Vailati (24 April 1863 – 14 May 1909) was an Italian pragmatist philosopher, historian of science, and mathematician.

== Life ==
Vailati was born in Crema, Lombardy, and studied engineering at the University of Turin. He went on to lecture in the history of mechanics there from 1896 to 1899, after working as an assistant to Giuseppe Peano and Vito Volterra. He resigned his university post in 1899 so that he could pursue his independent studies, making a living from high-school mathematics teaching. During his lifetime, he became internationally known, his writings having been translated into English, French, and Polish, though he was largely forgotten after his death in Rome. He was rediscovered in the late 1950s. He did not publish any complete books, but left about 200 essays and reviews across a range of academic disciplines.

== Philosophy ==
Vailati's view of philosophy was that it provided preparation and the tools for scientific work. For that reason, and because philosophy should be neutral between rival beliefs, conceptions, theoretical structures, etc., the philosopher should avoid the use of special technical language, but should use the language that he finds used in those areas in which he is interested. That is not to say that the philosopher should merely accept whatever he finds; an ordinary-language term may be problematic, but its deficiencies should be corrected rather than replacing it with some new technical term.

His view of truth and meaning was influenced by philosophers such as C.S. Peirce and Ernst Mach. He carefully distinguished between meaning and truth: "the question of determining what we mean when we propound a given proposition is entirely different from the question of deciding whether it is true or false. Nevertheless, having decided what is meant, the work of deciding whether it is true or false is crucial. Vailati held a moderate positivist view, in both science and philosophy:

"it must be demanded of anybody who advances a thesis that he be capable of indicating the facts which according to him should obtain (or have obtained) if his thesis were true, and also their difference from other facts which according to him would obtain (or have obtained) if it were not true"

Vailati's influences and contacts were many and varied, belying the oversimple label often attached to him: "the Italian pragmatist". While owing much to Peirce and William James (between whose thought he was one of the first to distinguish), he also acknowledged the influence of Plato and George Berkeley (both of whom he saw as important precursors of, or influences on, pragmatism), Gottfried Leibniz, Victoria Welby-Gregory, G.E. Moore, Bertrand Russell, Peano, and Franz Brentano. He corresponded with many of his contemporaries.

His early work included papers on symbolic logic, focusing on its rôle in philosophy, and distinguishing between logic and psychology and epistemology.

== History of science ==
Vailata's main historical interests concerned mechanics, logic, and geometry, and he was an important contributor to a number of areas, including the study of post-Aristotelian Greek mechanics, of Galileo's predecessors, of the notion and rôle of definition in the work of Plato and Euclid, of mathematical influences on logic and epistemology, and of the non-Euclidean geometry of Gerolamo Saccheri. He was particularly interested in the ways in which what might be seen as the same problems are addressed and dealt with at different times.

His historical work was interrelated with his philosophical work, involving the same fundamental views and methodology. Vailati saw the two as differing in approach rather than subject matter, and believed that there should be co-operation between philosophers and scientists in the pursuit of historical studies. He also held that a complete history demanded that one take into account the relevant social background.

Of a certain interest is the participation of Vailati in the scientific activity of the chair of "Calculus infinitesimal" held by Giuseppe Peano. We are in Turin in 1892. The period is full of Prolusions and there is the emergence of disciplines such as anthropology and sociology, which have produced a new scientific concept in the nineteenth century. The Turin Prolusions (1896-1898) open the horizon to new discoveries and to the formulations of scientific theories and hypotheses concerning the relationship between science and its history. In this context there are the "questions of words", which concern language and its functioning as a means of transmitting ideas.

The superseding of scientific theories and other results doesn't involve their destruction, for their importance is increased by their being superseded: "Every error shows us a rock to be avoided, while not every discovery shows us a path to be followed".

== See also ==
- Giovanni Papini
- Point-pair separation

== Sources ==
- Giovanni Vailati (1972) Scritti filosofici.
- O'Connor, John J.; Robertson, Edmund F., "Giovanni Vailati", MacTutor History of Mathematics Archive, University of St Andrews
- Ivor Grattan-Guinness (2000) The Search for Mathematical Roots 1870–1940, Princeton University Press.
- Ferruccio Rossi-Landi (1967) "Giovanni Vailati", in The Encyclopedia of Philosophy, ed. Paul Edwards. Collier Macmillan
- C. Arrighi, P. Cantù, M. De Zan and P. Suppes (editors) (2010) Logic and Pragmatism. Selected Essays by Giovanni Vailati, CSLI, Stanford, California.
