= Esakia duality =

In mathematics, Esakia duality is a theorem establishing a correspondence between Heyting algebras and certain ordered topological spaces called Esakia spaces; more precisely, it states that the category of Heyting algebras is dually equivalent to the category of Esakia spaces.

Let Esa denote the category of Esakia spaces and Esakia morphisms.

Let H be a Heyting algebra, X denote the set of prime filters of H, and ≤ denote set-theoretic inclusion on the prime filters of H. Also, for each a ∈ H, let φ(a) = {x ∈ X : a ∈ x}, and let τ denote the topology on X generated by {φ(a), X − φ(a) : a ∈ H}.

Theorem: (X, τ, ≤) is an Esakia space, called the Esakia dual of H. Moreover, φ is a Heyting algebra isomorphism from H onto the Heyting algebra of all clopen up-sets of (X,τ,≤). Furthermore, each Esakia space is isomorphic in Esa to the Esakia dual of some Heyting algebra.

This representation of Heyting algebras by means of Esakia spaces is functorial and yields a dual equivalence between the categories

- HA of Heyting algebras and Heyting algebra homomorphisms

and

- Esa of Esakia spaces and Esakia morphisms.

Theorem: HA is dually equivalent to Esa.

The duality can also be expressed in terms of spectral spaces, where it says that the category of Heyting algebras is dually equivalent to the category of Heyting spaces.

== See also ==
- Duality theory for distributive lattices
