= Point-pair separation =

Property of pairs of points in a cycle

In mathematics, two pairs of points in a cyclic order such as the real projective line separate each other when they occur alternately in the order. Thus the ordering a b c d of four points has (a,c) and (b,d) as separating pairs. This point-pair separation is an invariant of projectivities of the line.

== Concept ==
The concept was described by G. B. Halsted at the outset of his Synthetic Projective Geometry:

With regard to a pair of different points of those on a straight, all remaining fall into two classes, such that every point belongs to one and only one. If two points belong to different classes with regard to a pair of points, then also the latter two belong to different classes with regard to the first two. Two such point pairs are said to 'separate each other.' Four different points on a straight can always be partitioned in one and only one way into pairs separating each other.

Given any pair of points on a projective line, they separate a third point from its harmonic conjugate.

A pair of lines in a pencil separates another pair when a transversal crosses the pairs in separated points.

The point-pair separation of points was written AC//BD by H. S. M. Coxeter in his textbook The Real Projective Plane.

=== Application ===
The relation may be used in showing the real projective plane is a complete space. The axiom of continuity used is "Every monotonic sequence of points has a limit." The point-pair separation is used to provide definitions:

- {A_{n}} is monotonic ≡ ∀ n > 1 $A_0 A_n // A_1 A_{n+1}.$
- M is a limit ≡ (∀ n > 2 $A_1 A_n // A_2 M$) ∧ (∀ P $A_1P // A_2 M$ ⇒ ∃ n $A_1 A_n // P M$ ).

== Unoriented circle ==
Whereas a linear order endows a set with a positive end and a negative end, an other relation forgets not only which end is which, but also where the ends are located. In this way it is a final, further weakening of the concepts of a betweenness relation and a cyclic order. There is nothing else that can be forgotten: up to the relevant sense of interdefinability, these three relations are the only nontrivial reducts of the ordered set of rational numbers.

A quaternary relation S(a, b, c, d) is defined satisfying certain axioms, which is interpreted as asserting that a and c separate b from d.

=== Axioms ===
The separation relation was described with axioms in 1898 by Giovanni Vailati.

- abcd = badc
- abcd = adcb
- abcd ⇒ ¬ acbd
- abcd ∨ acdb ∨ adbc
- abcd ∧ acde ⇒ abde.
