= Linearly ordered group =

Group with translationally invariant total order

In mathematics, specifically abstract algebra, a linearly ordered or totally ordered group is a group G equipped with a total order "≤" that is translation-invariant. This may have different meanings. We say that (G, ≤) is a:

- left-ordered group if ≤ is left-invariant, that is a ≤ b implies ca ≤ cb for all a, b, c in G,
- right-ordered group if ≤ is right-invariant, that is a ≤ b implies ac ≤ bc for all a, b, c in G,
- bi-ordered group if ≤ is bi-invariant, that is it is both left- and right-invariant.

A group G is said to be left-orderable (or right-orderable, or bi-orderable) if there exists a left- (or right-, or bi-) invariant order on G. A simple necessary condition for a group to be left-orderable is to have no elements of finite order; however this is not a sufficient condition. It is equivalent for a group to be left- or right-orderable; however there exist left-orderable groups which are not bi-orderable.

== Further definitions ==
In this section, $\le$ is a left-invariant order on a group $G$ with identity element $e$. All that is said applies to right-invariant orders with the obvious modifications. Note that $\le$ being left-invariant is equivalent to the order $\le'$ defined by $g \le' h$ if and only if $h^{-1} \le g^{-1}$ being right-invariant. In particular, a group being left-orderable is the same as it being right-orderable.

In analogy with ordinary numbers, we call an element $g \not= e$ of an ordered group positive if $e \le g$. The set of positive elements in an ordered group is called the positive cone, it is often denoted with $G_+$; the slightly different notation $G^+$ is used for the positive cone together with the identity element.

The positive cone $G_+$ characterises the order $\le$; indeed, by left-invariance we see that $g \le h$ if and only if $g^{-1} h \in G_+$. In fact, a left-ordered group can be defined as a group $G$ together with a subset $P$ satisfying the two conditions that:

1. for $g, h \in P$ we have also $gh \in P$;
2. let $P^{-1} = \{g^{-1} \mid g \in P\}$, then $G$ is the disjoint union of $P, P^{-1}$ and $\{e\}$.

The order $\le_P$ associated with $P$ is defined by $g \le_P h \Leftrightarrow g^{-1} h \in P$; the first condition amounts to left-invariance and the second to the order being well-defined and total. The positive cone of $\le_P$ is $P$.

The left-invariant order $\le$ is bi-invariant if and only if it is conjugacy-invariant, that is if $g \le h$ then for any $x \in G$ we have $xgx^{-1} \le xhx^{-1}$ as well. This is equivalent to the positive cone being stable under inner automorphisms.

If $a \in G$, then the absolute value of $a$, denoted by $|a|$, is defined to be:
$$|a|:=\begin{cases}a, & \text{if }a \ge 0,\\ a^{-1}, & \text{otherwise}.\end{cases}$$
If in addition the group $G$ is abelian, then for any $a, b \in G$ a triangle inequality is satisfied: $|a+b| \le |a|+|b|$.

== Examples ==
An order-preserving bijection f of a chain with f(x) > x gives x < f(x) < f^{2}(x) < ⋯, so no power of f is the identity. A left-ordered group acts on itself by order-preserving left multiplication, so it is torsion-free.

Any left- or right-orderable group is torsion-free, that is it contains no elements of finite order besides the identity. Conversely, F. W. Levi showed that a torsion-free abelian group is bi-orderable; this is still true for nilpotent groups but there exist torsion-free, finitely presented groups which are not left-orderable.

=== Archimedean ordered groups ===
Nontrivial finite groups are not orderable; by Hölder's theorem, the Archimedean ordered groups are those isomorphic to subgroups of (ℝ, +).

Otto Hölder showed that every Archimedean group (a bi-ordered group satisfying an Archimedean property) is isomorphic to a subgroup of the additive group of real numbers, (Fuchs & Salce 2001, p. 61). If we write the Archimedean l.o. group multiplicatively, this may be shown by considering the Dedekind completion, $\widehat{G}$ of the closure of a l.o. group under $n$th roots. We endow this space with the usual topology of a linear order, and then it can be shown that for each $g\in\widehat{G}$ the exponential maps $g^{\cdot}:(\mathbb{R},+)\to(\widehat{G},\cdot) :\lim_{i}q_{i}\in\mathbb{Q}\mapsto \lim_{i}g^{q_{i}}$ are well defined order preserving/reversing, topological group isomorphisms. Completing a l.o. group can be difficult in the non-Archimedean case. In these cases, one may classify a group by its rank: which is related to the order type of the largest sequence of convex subgroups.

=== Other examples ===
Free groups are left-orderable. More generally this is also the case for right-angled Artin groups. Braid groups are also left-orderable.

The group given by the presentation $\langle a, b | a^2ba^2b^{-1}, b^2ab^2a^{-1}\rangle$ is torsion-free but not left-orderable; note that it is a 3-dimensional crystallographic group (it can be realised as the group generated by two glided half-turns with orthogonal axes and the same translation length), and it is the same group that was proven to be a counterexample to the unit conjecture. More generally the topic of orderability of 3--manifold groups is interesting for its relation with various topological invariants. There exists a 3-manifold group which is left-orderable but not bi-orderable (in fact it does not satisfy the weaker property of being locally indicable).

Left-orderable groups have also attracted interest from the perspective of dynamical systems as it is known that a countable group is left-orderable if and only if it acts on the real line by homeomorphisms. Non-examples related to this paradigm are lattices in higher rank Lie groups; it is known that (for example) finite-index subgroups in $\mathrm{SL}_n(\mathbb Z)$ are not left-orderable; a wide generalisation of this was announced in 2020.

== See also ==
- Cyclically ordered group
- Hahn embedding theorem
- Lexicographic order § Group orders of Zn
- Partially ordered group
