= Ordered geometry =

Form of geometry without distances

Ordered geometry is a form of geometry featuring the concept of intermediacy (or "betweenness") but, like projective geometry, omitting the basic notion of measurement. Ordered geometry is a fundamental geometry forming a common framework for affine, Euclidean, absolute, and hyperbolic geometry (but not for projective geometry).

== History ==
Moritz Pasch first defined a geometry without reference to measurement in 1882. His axioms were improved upon by Peano (1889), Hilbert (1899), and Veblen (1904). Euclid anticipated Pasch's approach in definition 4 of The Elements: "a straight line is a line which lies evenly with the points on itself".

== Primitive concepts ==
The only primitive notions in ordered geometry are points A, B, C, ... and the ternary relation of intermediacy [ABC] which can be read as "B is between A and C".

== Definitions ==
The segment AB is the set of points P such that [APB].

The interval AB is the segment AB and its end points A and B.

The ray A/B (read as "the ray from A away from B") is the set of points P such that [PAB].

The line AB is the interval AB and the two rays A/B and B/A. Points on the line AB are said to be collinear.

An angle consists of a point O (the vertex) and two non-collinear rays out from O (the sides).

A triangle is given by three non-collinear points (called vertices) and their three segments AB, BC, and CA.

If three points A, B, and C are non-collinear, then a plane ABC is the set of all points collinear with pairs of points on one or two of the sides of triangle ABC.

If four points A, B, C, and D are non-coplanar, then a space (3-space) ABCD is the set of all points collinear with pairs of points selected from any of the four faces (planar regions) of the tetrahedron ABCD.

== Axioms of ordered geometry ==
1. There exist at least two points.
2. If A and B are distinct points, there exists a C such that [ABC].
3. If [ABC], then A and C are distinct (A ≠ C).
4. If [ABC], then [CBA] but not [CAB].
5. If C and D are distinct points on the line AB, then A is on the line CD.
6. If AB is a line, there is a point C not on the line AB.
7. (Axiom of Pasch) If ABC is a triangle and [BCD] and [CEA], then there exists a point F on the line DE for which [AFB].
8. Axiom of dimensionality:
  1. For planar ordered geometry, all points are in one plane. Or
  2. If ABC is a plane, then there exists a point D not in the plane ABC.
9. All points are in the same plane, space, etc. (depending on the dimension one chooses to work within).
10. (Dedekind's Axiom) For every partition of all the points on a line into two nonempty sets such that no point of either lies between two points of the other, there is a point of one set which lies between every other point of that set and every point of the other set.

These axioms are closely related to Hilbert's axioms of order. For a comprehensive survey of axiomatizations of ordered geometry see Pambuccian (2011).

== Results ==
=== Sylvester's problem of collinear points ===
The Sylvester–Gallai theorem can be proven within ordered geometry.

=== Parallelism ===
Gauss, Bolyai, and Lobachevsky developed a notion of parallelism which can be expressed in ordered geometry.

Theorem (existence of parallelism): Given a point A and a line r, not through A, there exist exactly two limiting rays from A in the plane Ar which do not meet r. So there is a parallel line through A which does not meet r.

Theorem (transmissibility of parallelism): The parallelism of a ray and a line is preserved by adding or subtracting a segment from the beginning of a ray.

The transitivity of parallelism cannot be proven in ordered geometry. Therefore, the "ordered" concept of parallelism does not form an equivalence relation on lines.

== See also ==
- Absolute geometry
- Affine geometry
- Cyclic order
- Erlangen program
- Euclidean geometry
  - Hilbert's axioms
  - Tarski's axioms
- Incidence geometry
- Lattice (order)
- Non-Euclidean geometry
- Point-pair separation
