= Well-founded relation =

Type of binary relation

Transitive binary relations

| | Symmetric | Antisymmetric | Connected | Well-founded | Has joins | Has meets | Reflexive | Irreflexive | Asymmetric |
| | | | Total, Semiconnex | | | | | Anti- reflexive |
| Equivalence relation | ✓ | ✗ | ✗ | ✗ | ✗ | ✗ | ✓ | ✗ | ✗ |
| Preorder (Quasiorder) | ✗ | ✗ | ✗ | ✗ | ✗ | ✗ | ✓ | ✗ | ✗ |
| Partial order | ✗ | ✓ | ✗ | ✗ | ✗ | ✗ | ✓ | ✗ | ✗ |
| Total preorder | ✗ | ✗ | ✓ | ✗ | ✗ | ✗ | ✓ | ✗ | ✗ |
| Total order | ✗ | ✓ | ✓ | ✗ | ✗ | ✗ | ✓ | ✗ | ✗ |
| Prewellordering | ✗ | ✗ | ✓ | ✓ | ✗ | ✗ | ✓ | ✗ | ✗ |
| Well-quasi-ordering | ✗ | ✗ | ✗ | ✓ | ✗ | ✗ | ✓ | ✗ | ✗ |
| Well-ordering | ✗ | ✓ | ✓ | ✓ | ✗ | ✗ | ✓ | ✗ | ✗ |
| Lattice | ✗ | ✓ | ✗ | ✗ | ✓ | ✓ | ✓ | ✗ | ✗ |
| Join-semilattice | ✗ | ✓ | ✗ | ✗ | ✓ | ✗ | ✓ | ✗ | ✗ |
| Meet-semilattice | ✗ | ✓ | ✗ | ✗ | ✗ | ✓ | ✓ | ✗ | ✗ |
| Strict partial order | ✗ | ✓ | ✗ | ✗ | ✗ | ✗ | ✗ | ✓ | ✓ |
| Strict weak order | ✗ | ✓ | ✗ | ✗ | ✗ | ✗ | ✗ | ✓ | ✓ |
| Strict total order | ✗ | ✓ | ✓ | ✗ | ✗ | ✗ | ✗ | ✓ | ✓ |
| | Symmetric | Antisymmetric | Connected | Well-founded | Has joins | Has meets | Reflexive | Irreflexive | Asymmetric |
| Definitions, for all $a, b$ and $S\neq\varnothing :$ | $$\begin{align}&aRb \\ \Rightarrow{} &bRa\end{align}$$ | $$\begin{align}aRb\text{ and }&bRa \\ \Rightarrow a ={} &b\end{align}$$ | $$\begin{align}a \neq{} &b \Rightarrow \\ aRb\text{ or }&bRa\end{align}$$ | $$\begin{align}\min S \\ \text{exists}\end{align}$$ | $$\begin{align}a \vee b \\ \text{exists}\end{align}$$ | $$\begin{align}a \wedge b \\ \text{exists}\end{align}$$ | $aRa$ | $\text{not }aRa$ | $$\begin{align}aRb \Rightarrow \\ \text{not }bRa\end{align}$$ |

✓ indicates that the column's property is always true for the row's term (at the very left), while ✗ indicates that the property is not guaranteed
in general (it might, or might not, hold). For example, that every equivalence relation is symmetric, but not necessarily antisymmetric,
is indicated by ✓ in the "Symmetric" column and ✗ in the "Antisymmetric" column, respectively.

All definitions tacitly require the homogeneous relation $R$ be transitive: for all $a, b, c,$ if $aRb$ and $bRc$ then $aRc.$
A term's definition may require additional properties that are not listed in this table.

In mathematics, a binary relation R is called well-founded (or wellfounded or foundational) on a set or, more generally, a class X if every non-empty subset (or subclass) S ⊆ X has a minimal element with respect to R; that is, there exists an m ∈ S such that for every s ∈ S, one does not have s R m. More formally, a relation is well-founded if:
$$(\forall S \subseteq X)\; [S \neq \varnothing \implies (\exists m \in S) (\forall s \in S) \lnot(s \mathrel{R} m)].$$

Strictly speaking, the above definition implies that R is irreflexive. Sometimes the notion is applied to reflexive (or at least non-irreflexive) relations, such as partial orders, by applying the above criterion to the strict part of the relation. If R is a relation, define the strict part $<_R$ by $x<_R y \iff xRy \land \lnot yRx$, and then say that R is well-founded if $<_R$ is well-founded in the sense above.

Some authors include an extra condition that R is set-like, i.e., that the elements less than any given element form a set.

Equivalently, assuming the axiom of dependent choice, a relation is well-founded when it contains no infinite descending chains, meaning there is no infinite sequence x_{0}, x_{1}, x_{2}, ... of elements of X such that x_{n+1} R x_{n} for every natural number n.

In order theory, a partial order is called well-founded if the corresponding strict order is a well-founded relation. If the order is a total order, then it is called a well-order.

In set theory, a set x is called a well-founded set if the set membership relation is well-founded on the transitive closure of x. The axiom of regularity, which is one of the axioms of Zermelo–Fraenkel set theory, asserts that all sets are well-founded.

A relation R is converse well-founded, upwards well-founded, or Noetherian on X, if the converse relation R^{T} is well-founded on X. In this case R is also said to satisfy the ascending chain condition. In the context of rewriting systems, a Noetherian relation is also called terminating.

== Induction and recursion ==
An important reason that well-founded relations are interesting is because a version of transfinite induction can be used on them: if (X, R) is a well-founded relation, P(x) is some property of elements of X, and we want to show that

P(x) holds for all elements x of X,

it suffices to show that:

If x is an element of X and P(y) is true for all y such that y R x, then P(x) must also be true.

That is,
$$(\forall x \in X)\;[(\forall y \in X)\;[y\mathrel{R}x \implies P(y)] \implies P(x)]\quad\text{implies}\quad(\forall x \in X)\,P(x).$$

Well-founded induction is sometimes called Noetherian induction, after Emmy Noether.

On par with induction, well-founded relations also support construction of objects by transfinite recursion. Let (X, R) be a set-like well-founded relation and F a function that assigns an object F(x, g) to each pair of an element x ∈ X and a function g on the set {y: y R x} of predecessors of x. Then there is a unique function G such that for every x ∈ X,
$$G(x) = F\left(x, G\vert_{\left\{y:\, y\mathrel{R}x\right\}}\right).$$

That is, if we want to construct a function G on X, we may define G(x) using the values of G(y) for y R x.

As an example, consider the well-founded relation (N, S), where N is the set of all natural numbers, and S is the graph of the successor function x ↦ x+1. Then induction on S is the usual mathematical induction, and recursion on S gives primitive recursion. If we consider the order relation (N, <), we obtain complete induction, and course-of-values recursion. The statement that (N, <) is well-founded is also known as the well-ordering principle.

There are other interesting special cases of well-founded induction. When the well-founded relation is the usual ordering on the class of all ordinal numbers, the technique is called transfinite induction. When the well-founded set is a set of recursively defined data structures, the technique is called structural induction. When the well-founded relation is set membership on the universal class, the technique is known as ∈-induction. See those articles for more details.

== Examples ==
Well-founded relations that are totally ordered are called well-ordered. Well-founded relations that are not totally ordered include:

- The positive integers {1, 2, 3, ...}, with the order defined by a < b if and only if a divides b and a ≠ b.
- The set of all finite strings over a fixed alphabet, with the order defined by s < t if and only if s is a proper substring of t.
- The set N × N of pairs of natural numbers, ordered by (n_{1}, n_{2}) < (m_{1}, m_{2}) if and only if n_{1} < m_{1} and n_{2} < m_{2}.

Well-founded relations that are neither totally ordered nor transitive relations include:

- Every class whose elements are sets, with the relation ∈ ("is an element of"). This is the axiom of regularity.
- The nodes of any finite directed acyclic graph, with the relation R defined such that a R b if and only if there is an edge from a to b.

Examples of relations that are not well-founded include:

- The negative integers {−1, −2, −3, ...}, with the usual order, since any unbounded subset has no least element.
- The set of strings over a finite alphabet with more than one element, under the usual (lexicographic) order, since the sequence "B" > "AB" > "AAB" > "AAAB" > ... is an infinite descending chain. This relation fails to be well-founded even though the entire set has a minimum element, namely the empty string.
- The set of non-negative rational numbers (or reals) under the standard ordering, since, for example, the subset of positive rationals (or reals) lacks a minimum.

== Other properties ==
If (X, <) is a well-founded relation and x is an element of X, then the descending chains starting at x are all finite, but this does not mean that their lengths are necessarily bounded. Consider the following example: Let X be the union of the positive integers with a new element ω that is bigger than any integer. Then X is a well-founded set, but there are descending chains starting at ω of arbitrary great (finite) length; the chain ω, n − 1, n − 2, ..., 2, 1 has length n for any n.

The Mostowski collapse lemma implies that set membership is a universal among the extensional well-founded relations: for any set-like well-founded relation R on a class X that is extensional, there exists a class C such that (X, R) is isomorphic to (C, ∈).

== Reflexivity ==
A relation R is said to be reflexive if a R a holds for every a in the domain of the relation. Every reflexive relation on a nonempty domain has infinite descending chains, because any constant sequence is a descending chain. For example, in the natural numbers with their usual order ≤, we have 1 ≥ 1 ≥ 1 ≥ .... To avoid these trivial descending sequences, when working with a partial order ≤, it is common to apply the definition of well foundedness (perhaps implicitly) to the alternate relation < defined such that a < b if and only if a ≤ b and a ≠ b. More generally, when working with a preorder ≤, it is common to use the relation < defined such that a < b if and only if a ≤ b and b ≰ a. In the context of the natural numbers, this means that the relation <, which is well-founded, is used instead of the relation ≤, which is not. In some texts, the definition of a well-founded relation is changed from the definition above to include these conventions.

== See also ==
- Infimum and supremum § Minimal upper bounds and maximal lower bounds
