= Connected relation =

Property of a relation on a set

Transitive binary relations

	Symmetric	Antisymmetric	Connected	Well-founded	Has joins	Has meets	Reflexive	Irreflexive	Asymmetric
			Total, Semiconnex					Anti- reflexive
Equivalence relation	✓	✗	✗	✗	✗	✗	✓	✗	✗
Preorder (Quasiorder)	✗	✗	✗	✗	✗	✗	✓	✗	✗
Partial order	✗	✓	✗	✗	✗	✗	✓	✗	✗
Total preorder	✗	✗	✓	✗	✗	✗	✓	✗	✗
Total order	✗	✓	✓	✗	✗	✗	✓	✗	✗
Prewellordering	✗	✗	✓	✓	✗	✗	✓	✗	✗
Well-quasi-ordering	✗	✗	✗	✓	✗	✗	✓	✗	✗
Well-ordering	✗	✓	✓	✓	✗	✗	✓	✗	✗
Lattice	✗	✓	✗	✗	✓	✓	✓	✗	✗
Join-semilattice	✗	✓	✗	✗	✓	✗	✓	✗	✗
Meet-semilattice	✗	✓	✗	✗	✗	✓	✓	✗	✗
Strict partial order	✗	✓	✗	✗	✗	✗	✗	✓	✓
Strict weak order	✗	✓	✗	✗	✗	✗	✗	✓	✓
Strict total order	✗	✓	✓	✗	✗	✗	✗	✓	✓
	Symmetric	Antisymmetric	Connected	Well-founded	Has joins	Has meets	Reflexive	Irreflexive	Asymmetric
Definitions, for all $a, b$ and $S\neq\varnothing :$	$$\begin{align}&aRb \\ \Rightarrow{} &bRa\end{align}$$	$$\begin{align}aRb\text{ and }&bRa \\ \Rightarrow a ={} &b\end{align}$$	$$\begin{align}a \neq{} &b \Rightarrow \\ aRb\text{ or }&bRa\end{align}$$	$$\begin{align}\min S \\ \text{exists}\end{align}$$	$$\begin{align}a \vee b \\ \text{exists}\end{align}$$	$$\begin{align}a \wedge b \\ \text{exists}\end{align}$$	$aRa$	$\text{not }aRa$	$$\begin{align}aRb \Rightarrow \\ \text{not }bRa\end{align}$$

✓ indicates that the column's property is always true for the row's term (at the very left), while ✗ indicates that the property is not guaranteed
in general (it might, or might not, hold). For example, that every equivalence relation is symmetric, but not necessarily antisymmetric,
is indicated by ✓ in the "Symmetric" column and ✗ in the "Antisymmetric" column, respectively.

All definitions tacitly require the homogeneous relation $R$ be transitive: for all $a, b, c,$ if $aRb$ and $bRc$ then $aRc.$
A term's definition may require additional properties that are not listed in this table.

In mathematics, a relation on a set is called connected or complete or total if it relates (or "compares") all distinct pairs of elements of the set in one direction or the other while it is called strongly connected if it relates all pairs of elements. As described in the terminology section below, the terminology for these properties is not uniform. This notion of "total" should not be confused with that of a total relation in the sense that for all $x \in X$ there is a $y \in X$ so that $x \mathrel{R} y$ (see serial relation).

Connectedness features prominently in the definition of total orders: a total (or linear) order is a partial order in which any two elements are comparable; that is, the order relation is connected. Similarly, a strict partial order that is connected is a strict total order. A relation is a total order if and only if it is both a partial order and strongly connected. A relation is a strict total order if, and only if, it is a strict partial order and just connected. A strict total order can never be strongly connected (except on an empty domain).

Some authors do however use the term connected with a much looser meaning, which applies to precisely those orders whose comparability graphs are connected graphs. This applies, for instance, to fences, of which none of the nontrivial examples are total orders.

== Formal definition ==
A relation $R$ on a set $X$ is called connected when for all $x, y \in X,$
$$\text{ if } x \neq y \text{ then } x \mathrel{R} y \quad \text{or} \quad y \mathrel{R} x,$$
or, equivalently, when for all $x, y \in X,$
$$x \mathrel{R} y \quad \text{or} \quad y \mathrel{R} x \quad \text{or} \quad x = y.$$

A relation with the property that for all $x, y \in X,$
$$x \mathrel{R} y \quad \text{or} \quad y \mathrel{R} x$$
is called strongly connected.

=== Terminology ===
The main use of the notion of connected relation is in the context of orders, where it is used to define total, or linear, orders. In this context, the property is often not specifically named. Rather, total orders are defined as partial orders in which any two elements are comparable. Thus, total is used more generally for relations that are connected or strongly connected. However, this notion of "total relation" must be distinguished from the property of being serial, which is also called total. Similarly, connected relations are sometimes called complete, although this, too, can lead to confusion: The universal relation is also called complete, and "complete" has several other meanings in order theory. Connected relations are also called connex or said to satisfy trichotomy (although the more common definition of trichotomy is stronger in that exactly one of the three options $x \mathrel{R} y, y \mathrel{R} x, x = y$ must hold).

When the relations considered are not orders, being connected and being strongly connected are importantly different properties. Sources which define both then use pairs of terms such as weakly connected and connected, complete and strongly complete, total and complete, semiconnex and connex, or connex and strictly connex, respectively, as alternative names for the notions of connected and strongly connected as defined above.

== Characterizations ==
Let $R$ be a homogeneous relation. The following are equivalent:

- $R$ is strongly connected;
- $U \subseteq R \cup R^\top$;
- $\overline{R} \subseteq R^\top$;
- $\overline{R}$ is asymmetric,

where $U$ is the universal relation and $R^\top$ is the converse relation of $R.$

The following are equivalent:

- $R$ is connected;
- $\overline{I} \subseteq R \cup R^\top$;
- $\overline{R} \subseteq R^\top \cup I$;
- $\overline{R}$ is antisymmetric,

where $\overline{R}$ is the complementary relation of $R$, $I$ is the identity relation and $R^\top$ is the converse relation of $R$.

Introducing progressions, Russell invoked the axiom of connection:

Whenever a series is originally given by a transitive asymmetrical relation, we can express connection by the condition that any two terms of our series are to have the generating relation.

— Bertrand Russell, The Principles of Mathematics, page 239

== Properties ==
- The edge relation (Note: Defined formally by $v E w$ if a graph edge leads from vertex $v$ to vertex $w$) $E$ of a tournament graph $G$ is always a connected relation on the set of $G$'s vertices.
- If a strongly connected relation is symmetric, it is the universal relation.
- A relation is strongly connected if, and only if, it is connected and reflexive. (Note: For the only if direction, both properties follow trivially. — For the if direction: when $x \neq y,$ then $x\mathrel{R}y \lor y\mathrel{R}x$ follows from connectedness; when $x = y,$ $x \mathrel{R} y$ follows from reflexivity.)
- A connected relation on a set $X$ cannot be antitransitive, provided $X$ has at least 4 elements. On a 3-element set $\{ a, b, c \},$ for example, the relation $\{ (a, b), (b, c), (c, a) \}$ has both properties.
- If $R$ is a connected relation on $X,$ then all, or all but one, elements of $X$ are in the range of $R.$ (Note: If $x, y \in X \setminus \operatorname{ran}(R),$ then $x \mathrel{R} y$ and $y \mathrel{R} x$ are impossible, so $x = y$ follows from connectedness.) Similarly, all, or all but one, elements of $X$ are in the domain of $R.$

== Notes ==
Proofs
