= Serial relation =

Relation that relates every element to some element

In set theory a serial relation is a homogeneous relation expressing the connection of an element of a sequence to the following element. The successor function used by Peano to define natural numbers is the prototype for a serial relation.

Bertrand Russell used serial relations in The Principles of Mathematics (1903) as he explored the foundations of order theory and its applications. The term serial relation was also used by B. A. Bernstein for an article showing that particular common axioms in order theory are nearly incompatible: connectedness, irreflexivity, and transitivity.

A serial relation R is an endorelation on a set U. As stated by Russell, $\forall x \exists y \ xRy ,$ where the universal and existential quantifiers refer to U. In contemporary language of relations, this property defines a total relation. But a total relation may be heterogeneous. Serial relations are of historic interest.

For a relation R, let {y: xRy} denote the "successor neighborhood" of x. A serial relation can be equivalently characterized as a relation for which every element has a non-empty successor neighborhood. Similarly, an inverse serial relation is a relation in which every element has non-empty "predecessor neighborhood".

In normal modal logic, the extension of fundamental axiom set K by the serial property results in axiom set D.

== Russell's series ==
Relations are used to develop series in The Principles of Mathematics. The prototype is Peano's successor function as a one-one relation on the natural numbers. Russell's series may be finite or generated by a relation giving cyclic order. In that case, the point-pair separation relation is used for description. To define a progression, he requires the generating relation to be a connected relation. Then ordinal numbers are derived from progressions, the finite ones are finite ordinals. Distinguishing open and closed series results in four total orders: finite, one end, no end and open, and no end and closed.

Contrary to other writers, Russell admits negative ordinals. For motivation, consider the scales of measurement using scientific notation, where a power of ten represents a decade of measure. Informally, this parameter corresponds to orders of magnitude used to quantify physical units. The parameter takes on negative as well as positive values.

=== Stretch ===
Russell adopted the term stretch from Meinong, who had contributed to the theory of distance. Stretch refers to the intermediate terms between two points in a series, and the "number of terms measures the distance and divisibility of the whole." To explain Meinong, Russell refers to the Cayley–Klein metric, which uses stretch coordinates in anharmonic ratios which determine distance by using logarithm.
