= Join and meet =

Concept in order theory

Transitive binary relations

	Symmetric	Antisymmetric	Connected	Well-founded	Has joins	Has meets	Reflexive	Irreflexive	Asymmetric
			Total, Semiconnex					Anti- reflexive
Equivalence relation	✓	✗	✗	✗	✗	✗	✓	✗	✗
Preorder (Quasiorder)	✗	✗	✗	✗	✗	✗	✓	✗	✗
Partial order	✗	✓	✗	✗	✗	✗	✓	✗	✗
Total preorder	✗	✗	✓	✗	✗	✗	✓	✗	✗
Total order	✗	✓	✓	✗	✗	✗	✓	✗	✗
Prewellordering	✗	✗	✓	✓	✗	✗	✓	✗	✗
Well-quasi-ordering	✗	✗	✗	✓	✗	✗	✓	✗	✗
Well-ordering	✗	✓	✓	✓	✗	✗	✓	✗	✗
Lattice	✗	✓	✗	✗	✓	✓	✓	✗	✗
Join-semilattice	✗	✓	✗	✗	✓	✗	✓	✗	✗
Meet-semilattice	✗	✓	✗	✗	✗	✓	✓	✗	✗
Strict partial order	✗	✓	✗	✗	✗	✗	✗	✓	✓
Strict weak order	✗	✓	✗	✗	✗	✗	✗	✓	✓
Strict total order	✗	✓	✓	✗	✗	✗	✗	✓	✓
	Symmetric	Antisymmetric	Connected	Well-founded	Has joins	Has meets	Reflexive	Irreflexive	Asymmetric
Definitions, for all $a, b$ and $S\neq\varnothing :$	$$\begin{align}&aRb \\ \Rightarrow{} &bRa\end{align}$$	$$\begin{align}aRb\text{ and }&bRa \\ \Rightarrow a ={} &b\end{align}$$	$$\begin{align}a \neq{} &b \Rightarrow \\ aRb\text{ or }&bRa\end{align}$$	$$\begin{align}\min S \\ \text{exists}\end{align}$$	$$\begin{align}a \vee b \\ \text{exists}\end{align}$$	$$\begin{align}a \wedge b \\ \text{exists}\end{align}$$	$aRa$	$\text{not }aRa$	$$\begin{align}aRb \Rightarrow \\ \text{not }bRa\end{align}$$

✓ indicates that the column's property is always true for the row's term (at the very left), while ✗ indicates that the property is not guaranteed
in general (it might, or might not, hold). For example, that every equivalence relation is symmetric, but not necessarily antisymmetric,
is indicated by ✓ in the "Symmetric" column and ✗ in the "Antisymmetric" column, respectively.

All definitions tacitly require the homogeneous relation $R$ be transitive: for all $a, b, c,$ if $aRb$ and $bRc$ then $aRc.$
A term's definition may require additional properties that are not listed in this table.

This Hasse diagram depicts a partially ordered set with four elements: a, b, the maximal element a $\vee$ b equal to the join of a and b, and the minimal element a $\wedge$ b equal to the meet of a and b. The join/meet of a maximal/minimal element and another element is the maximal/minimal element and conversely the meet/join of a maximal/minimal element with another element is the other element. Thus every pair in this poset has both a meet and a join and the poset can be classified as a lattice.

In mathematics, specifically order theory, the join of a subset $S$ of a partially ordered set $P$ is the supremum (least upper bound) of $S,$ denoted $\bigvee S,$ and similarly, the meet of $S$ is the infimum (greatest lower bound), denoted $\bigwedge S.$ In general, the join and meet of a subset of a partially ordered set need not exist. Join and meet are dual to one another with respect to order inversion.

A partially ordered set in which all pairs have a join is a join-semilattice. Dually, a partially ordered set in which all pairs have a meet is a meet-semilattice. A partially ordered set that is both a join-semilattice and a meet-semilattice is a lattice. A lattice in which every subset, not just every pair, possesses a meet and a join is a complete lattice. It is also possible to define a partial lattice, in which not all pairs have a meet or join but the operations (when defined) satisfy certain axioms.

The join/meet of a subset of a totally ordered set is simply the maximal/minimal element of that subset, if such an element exists.

If a subset $S$ of a partially ordered set $P$ is also an (upward) directed set, then its join (if it exists) is called a directed join or directed supremum. Dually, if $S$ is a downward directed set, then its meet (if it exists) is a directed meet or directed infimum.

== Definitions ==
=== Partial order approach ===
Let $A$ be a set with a partial order $\,\leq,\,$ and let $x, y \in A.$ An element $m$ of $A$ is called the meet (or greatest lower bound or infimum) of $x \text{ and } y$ and is denoted by $x \wedge y,$ if the following two conditions are satisfied:

1. $m \leq x \text{ and } m \leq y$ (that is, $m$ is a lower bound of $x \text{ and } y$).
2. For any $w \in A,$ if $w \leq x \text{ and } w \leq y,$ then $w \leq m$ (that is, $m$ is greater than or equal to any other lower bound of $x \text{ and } y$).

The meet need not exist, either since the pair has no lower bound at all, or since none of the lower bounds is greater than all the others. However, if there is a meet of $x \text{ and } y,$ then it is unique, since if both $m \text{ and } m^{\prime}$ are greatest lower bounds of $x \text{ and } y,$ then $m \leq m^{\prime} \text{ and } m^{\prime} \leq m,$ and thus $m = m^{\prime}.$ If not all pairs of elements from $A$ have a meet, then the meet can still be seen as a partial binary operation on $A.$

If the meet does exist then it is denoted $x \wedge y.$ If all pairs of elements from $A$ have a meet, then the meet is a binary operation on $A,$ and it is easy to see that this operation fulfills the following three conditions: For any elements $x, y, z \in A,$

1. $x \wedge y = y \wedge x$ (commutativity),
2. $x \wedge (y \wedge z) = (x \wedge y) \wedge z$ (associativity), and
3. $x \wedge x = x$ (idempotency).

Joins are defined dually with the join of $x \text{ and } y,$ if it exists, denoted by $x \vee y.$ An element $j$ of $A$ is the join (or least upper bound or supremum) of $x \text{ and } y$ in $A$ if the following two conditions are satisfied:

1. $x \leq j \text{ and } y \leq j$ (that is, $j$ is an upper bound of $x \text{ and } y$).
2. For any $w \in A,$ if $x \leq w \text{ and } y \leq w,$ then $j \leq w$ (that is, $j$ is less than or equal to any other upper bound of $x \text{ and } y$).

=== Universal algebra approach ===
By definition, a binary operation $\,\wedge\,$ on a set $A$ is a meet if it satisfies the three conditions a, b, and c. The pair $(A, \wedge)$ is then a meet-semilattice. Moreover, we then may define a binary relation $\,\leq\,$ on A, by stating that $x \leq y$ if and only if $x \wedge y = x.$ In fact, this relation is a partial order on $A.$ Indeed, for any elements $x, y, z \in A,$

- $x \leq x,$ since $x \wedge x = x$ by c;
- if $x \leq y \text{ and } y \leq x$ then $x = x \wedge y = y \wedge x = y$ by a; and
- if $x \leq y \text{ and } y \leq z$ then $x \leq z$ since then $x \wedge z = (x \wedge y) \wedge z = x \wedge (y \wedge z) = x \wedge y = x$ by b.

Both meets and joins equally satisfy this definition: a couple of associated meet and join operations yield partial orders which are the reverse of each other. When choosing one of these orders as the main ones, one also fixes which operation is considered a meet (the one giving the same order) and which is considered a join (the other one).

=== Equivalence of approaches ===
If $(A, \leq)$ is a partially ordered set, such that each pair of elements in $A$ has a meet, then indeed $x \wedge y = x$ if and only if $x \leq y,$ since in the latter case indeed $x$ is a lower bound of $x \text{ and } y,$ and since $x$ is the greatest lower bound if and only if it is a lower bound. Thus, the partial order defined by the meet in the universal algebra approach coincides with the original partial order.

Conversely, if $(A, \wedge)$ is a meet-semilattice, and the partial order $\,\leq\,$ is defined as in the universal algebra approach, and $z = x \wedge y$ for some elements $x, y \in A,$ then $z$ is the greatest lower bound of $x \text{ and } y$ with respect to $\,\leq,\,$ since
$$z \wedge x = x \wedge z = x \wedge (x \wedge y) = (x \wedge x) \wedge y = x \wedge y = z$$
and therefore $z \leq x.$ Similarly, $z \leq y,$ and if $w$ is another lower bound of $x \text{ and } y,$ then $w \wedge x = w \wedge y = w,$ whence
$$w \wedge z = w \wedge (x \wedge y) = (w \wedge x) \wedge y = w \wedge y = w.$$
Thus, there is a meet defined by the partial order defined by the original meet, and the two meets coincide.

In other words, the two approaches yield essentially equivalent concepts, a set equipped with both a binary relation and a binary operation, such that each one of these structures determines the other, and fulfill the conditions for partial orders or meets, respectively.

== Meets of general subsets ==
If $(A, \wedge)$ is a meet-semilattice, then the meet may be extended to a well-defined meet of any non-empty finite set, by the technique described in iterated binary operations. Alternatively, if the meet defines or is defined by a partial order, some subsets of $A$ indeed have infima with respect to this, and it is reasonable to consider such an infimum as the meet of the subset. For non-empty finite subsets, the two approaches yield the same result, and so either may be taken as a definition of meet. In the case where each subset of $A$ has a meet, in fact $(A, \leq)$ is a complete lattice; for details, see completeness (order theory).

== Examples ==
If some power set $2^X$ is partially ordered in the usual way (by $\,\subseteq$) then joins are unions and meets are intersections; in symbols, $\,\vee \,=\, \cup\, \text{ and } \,\wedge \,=\, \cap\,$ (where the similarity of these symbols may be used as a mnemonic for remembering that $\,\vee\,$ denotes the join/supremum and $\,\wedge\,$ denotes the meet/infimum (Note: It can be immediately determined that supremums and infimums in this canonical, simple example $(2^X, \subseteq)$ are $\,\cup\, \text{ and } \,\cap\,,$ respectively. The similarity of the symbol $\,\vee\,$ to $\,\cup\,$ and of $\,\wedge\,$ to $\,\cap\,$ may thus be used as a mnemonic for remembering that in the most general setting, $\,\vee\,$ denotes the supremum (because a supremum is a bound from above, just like $A \cup B$ is "above" $A$ and $B$) while $\,\wedge\,$ denotes the infimum (because an infimum is a bound from below, just like $A \cap B$ is "below" $A$ and $B$). This can also be used to remember whether meets/joins are denoted by $\,\vee\,$ or by $\,\wedge.\,$ Intuition suggests that "join"ing two sets together should produce their union $A \cup B,$ which looks similar to $A \vee B,$ so "join" must be denoted by $\,\vee.\,$ Similarly, two sets should "meet" at their intersection $A \cap B,$ which looks similar to $A \wedge B,$ so "meet" must be denoted by $\,\wedge.\,$)).

More generally, suppose that $\mathcal{F} \neq \varnothing$ is a family of subsets of some set $X$ that is partially ordered by $\,\subseteq.\,$ If $\mathcal{F}$ is closed under arbitrary unions and arbitrary intersections and if $A, B, \left(F_i\right)_{i \in I}$ belong to $\mathcal{F}$ then
$$A \vee B = A \cup B, \quad A \wedge B = A \cap B, \quad \bigvee_{i \in I} F_i = \bigcup_{i \in I} F_i, \quad \text{ and } \quad \bigwedge_{i \in I} F_i = \bigcap_{i \in I} F_i.$$
But if $\mathcal{F}$ is not closed under unions then $A \vee B$ exists in $(\mathcal{F}, \subseteq)$ if and only if there exists a unique $\,\subseteq$-smallest $J \in \mathcal{F}$ such that $A \cup B \subseteq J.$ For example, if $\mathcal{F} = \{ \{1\}, \{2\}, \{1, 2, 3\}, \R \}$ then $\{1\} \vee \{2\} = \{1, 2, 3\}$ whereas if $\mathcal{F} = \{ \{1\}, \{2\}, \{1, 2, 3\}, \{0, 1, 2\}, \R \}$ then $\{1\} \vee \{2\}$ does not exist because the sets $\{0, 1, 2\} \text{ and } \{1, 2, 3\}$ are the only upper bounds of $\{1\} \text{ and } \{2\}$ in $(\mathcal{F}, \subseteq)$ that could possibly be the least upper bound $\{1\} \vee \{2\}$ but $\{0, 1, 2\} \not\subseteq \{1, 2, 3\}$ and $\{1, 2, 3\} \not\subseteq \{0, 1, 2\}.$ If $\mathcal{F} = \{ \{1\}, \{2\}, \{0, 2, 3\}, \{0, 1, 3\} \}$ then $\{1\} \vee \{2\}$ does not exist because there is no upper bound of $\{1\} \text{ and } \{2\}$ in $(\mathcal{F}, \subseteq).$

== See also ==
- Locally convex vector lattice
