= Reflexive relation =

Binary relation that relates every element to itself

Transitive binary relations

	Symmetric	Antisymmetric	Connected	Well-founded	Has joins	Has meets	Reflexive	Irreflexive	Asymmetric
			Total, Semiconnex					Anti- reflexive
Equivalence relation	✓	✗	✗	✗	✗	✗	✓	✗	✗
Preorder (Quasiorder)	✗	✗	✗	✗	✗	✗	✓	✗	✗
Partial order	✗	✓	✗	✗	✗	✗	✓	✗	✗
Total preorder	✗	✗	✓	✗	✗	✗	✓	✗	✗
Total order	✗	✓	✓	✗	✗	✗	✓	✗	✗
Prewellordering	✗	✗	✓	✓	✗	✗	✓	✗	✗
Well-quasi-ordering	✗	✗	✗	✓	✗	✗	✓	✗	✗
Well-ordering	✗	✓	✓	✓	✗	✗	✓	✗	✗
Lattice	✗	✓	✗	✗	✓	✓	✓	✗	✗
Join-semilattice	✗	✓	✗	✗	✓	✗	✓	✗	✗
Meet-semilattice	✗	✓	✗	✗	✗	✓	✓	✗	✗
Strict partial order	✗	✓	✗	✗	✗	✗	✗	✓	✓
Strict weak order	✗	✓	✗	✗	✗	✗	✗	✓	✓
Strict total order	✗	✓	✓	✗	✗	✗	✗	✓	✓
	Symmetric	Antisymmetric	Connected	Well-founded	Has joins	Has meets	Reflexive	Irreflexive	Asymmetric
Definitions, for all $a, b$ and $S\neq\varnothing :$	$$\begin{align}&aRb \\ \Rightarrow{} &bRa\end{align}$$	$$\begin{align}aRb\text{ and }&bRa \\ \Rightarrow a ={} &b\end{align}$$	$$\begin{align}a \neq{} &b \Rightarrow \\ aRb\text{ or }&bRa\end{align}$$	$$\begin{align}\min S \\ \text{exists}\end{align}$$	$$\begin{align}a \vee b \\ \text{exists}\end{align}$$	$$\begin{align}a \wedge b \\ \text{exists}\end{align}$$	$aRa$	$\text{not }aRa$	$$\begin{align}aRb \Rightarrow \\ \text{not }bRa\end{align}$$

✓ indicates that the column's property is always true for the row's term (at the very left), while ✗ indicates that the property is not guaranteed
in general (it might, or might not, hold). For example, that every equivalence relation is symmetric, but not necessarily antisymmetric,
is indicated by ✓ in the "Symmetric" column and ✗ in the "Antisymmetric" column, respectively.

All definitions tacitly require the homogeneous relation $R$ be transitive: for all $a, b, c,$ if $aRb$ and $bRc$ then $aRc.$
A term's definition may require additional properties that are not listed in this table.

In mathematics, a binary relation $R$ on a set $X$ is reflexive if it relates every element of $X$ to itself.

An example of a reflexive relation is the relation "is equal to" on the set of real numbers, since every real number is equal to itself. A reflexive relation is said to have the reflexive property or is said to possess reflexivity. Along with symmetry and transitivity, reflexivity is one of three properties defining equivalence relations.

== Etymology ==
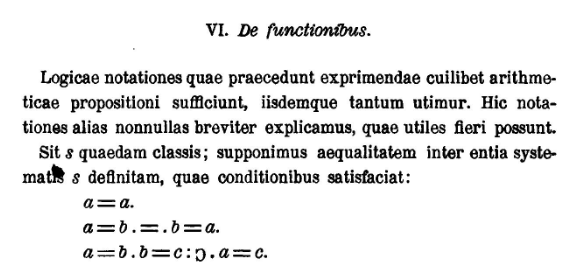
Giuseppe Peano's introduction of the reflexive property, along with symmetry and transitivity

The word reflexive is originally derived from the Medieval Latin reflexivus ('recoiling' [cf. reflex], or 'directed upon itself') (c. 1250 AD) from the classical Latin reflexus- ('turn away', 'reflection') + -īvus (suffix). The word entered Early Modern English in the 1580s. The sense of the word meaning 'directed upon itself', as now used in mathematics, surviving mostly by its use in philosophy and grammar (cf. Reflexive verb and Reflexive pronoun).

The first explicit use of "reflexivity", that is, describing a relation as having the property that every element is related to itself, is generally attributed to Giuseppe Peano in his Arithmetices principia (1889), wherein he defines one of the fundamental properties of equality being $a = a$. The first use of the word reflexive in the sense of mathematics and logic was by Bertrand Russell in his Principles of Mathematics (1903).

== Definitions ==
A relation $R$ on the set $X$ is said to be reflexive if for every $x \in X$, $(x,x) \in R$.

Equivalently, letting $\operatorname{I}_X := \{ (x, x) ~:~ x \in X \}$ denote the identity relation on $X$, the relation $R$ is reflexive if $\operatorname{I}_X \subseteq R$.

The reflexive closure of $R$ is the union $R \cup \operatorname{I}_X,$ which can equivalently be defined as the smallest (with respect to $\subseteq$) reflexive relation on $X$ that is a superset of $R.$ A relation $R$ is reflexive if and only if it is equal to its reflexive closure.

The reflexive reduction or irreflexive kernel of $R$ is the smallest (with respect to $\subseteq$) relation on $X$ that has the same reflexive closure as $R.$ It is equal to $R \setminus \operatorname{I}_X = \{ (x, y) \in R ~:~ x \neq y \}.$ The reflexive reduction of $R$ can, in a sense, be seen as a construction that is the "opposite" of the reflexive closure of $R.$ For example, the reflexive closure of the canonical strict inequality $<$ on the reals $\mathbb{R}$ is the usual non-strict inequality $\leq$ whereas the reflexive reduction of $\leq$ is $<.$

=== Related definitions ===
There are several definitions related to the reflexive property. The relation $R$ is called:

irreflexive, anti-reflexive or aliorelative
if it does not relate any element to itself; that is, if $x R x$ holds for no $x \in X.$ A relation is irreflexive if and only if its complement in $X \times X$ is reflexive. An asymmetric relation is necessarily irreflexive. A transitive and irreflexive relation is necessarily asymmetric.
left quasi-reflexive
if whenever $x, y \in X$ are such that $x R y,$ then necessarily $x R x.$
right quasi-reflexive
if whenever $x, y \in X$ are such that $x R y,$ then necessarily $y R y.$
quasi-reflexive
if every element that is part of some relation is related to itself. Explicitly, this means that whenever $x, y \in X$ are such that $x R y,$ then necessarily $x R x$ and $y R y.$ Equivalently, a binary relation is quasi-reflexive if and only if it is both left quasi-reflexive and right quasi-reflexive. A relation $R$ is quasi-reflexive if and only if its symmetric closure $R \cup R^{\operatorname{T}}$ is left (or right) quasi-reflexive.
antisymmetric
if whenever $x, y \in X$ are such that $x R y \text{ and } y R x,$ then necessarily $x = y.$
coreflexive
if whenever $x, y \in X$ are such that $x R y,$ then necessarily $x = y.$ A relation $R$ is coreflexive if and only if its symmetric closure is anti-symmetric.

A reflexive relation on a nonempty set $X$ can neither be irreflexive, nor asymmetric ($R$ is called asymmetric if $x R y$ implies not $y R x$), nor antitransitive ($R$ is antitransitive if $x R y \text{ and } y R z$ implies not $x R z$).

== Examples ==
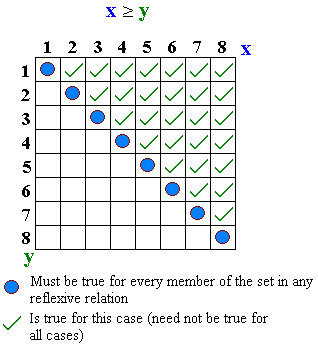
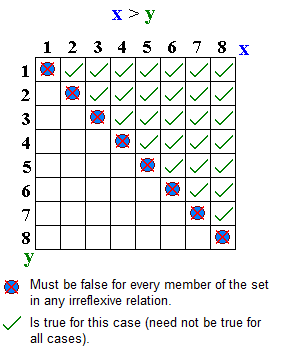

Examples of reflexive relations include:

- "is equal to" (equality)
- "is a subset of" (set inclusion)
- "divides" (divisibility)
- "is greater than or equal to"
- "is less than or equal to"

Examples of irreflexive relations include:

- "is not equal to"
- "is coprime to" on the integers larger than 1
- "is a proper subset of"
- "is greater than"
- "is less than"

An example of an irreflexive relation, which means that it does not relate any element to itself, is the "greater than" relation ($x > y$) on the real numbers. Not every relation which is not reflexive is irreflexive; it is possible to define relations where some elements are related to themselves but others are not (that is, neither all nor none are). For example, the binary relation "the product of $x$ and $y$ is even" is reflexive on the set of even numbers, irreflexive on the set of odd numbers, and neither reflexive nor irreflexive on the set of natural numbers.

An example of a quasi-reflexive relation $R$ is "has the same limit as" on the set of sequences of real numbers: not every sequence has a limit, and thus the relation is not reflexive, but if a sequence has the same limit as some sequence, then it has the same limit as itself. An example of a left quasi-reflexive relation is a left Euclidean relation, which is always left quasi-reflexive but not necessarily right quasi-reflexive, and thus not necessarily quasi-reflexive.

An example of a coreflexive relation is the relation on integers in which each odd number is related to itself and there are no other relations. The equality relation is the only example of a both reflexive and coreflexive relation, and any coreflexive relation is a subset of the identity relation. The union of a coreflexive relation and a transitive relation on the same set is always transitive.

== Number of reflexive relations ==
The number of reflexive relations on an $n$-element set is $2^{n^2-n}.$

Number of n-element binary relations of different types
Elements	Any	Transitive	Reflexive	Symmetric	Preorder	Partial order	Total preorder	Total order	Equivalence relation
0	1	1	1	1	1	1	1	1	1
1	2	2	1	2	1	1	1	1	1
2	16	13	4	8	4	3	3	2	2
3	512	171	64	64	29	19	13	6	5
4	65,536	3,994	4,096	1,024	355	219	75	24	15
n	2^{n^{2}}		2^{n(n−1)}	2^{n(n+1)/2}			∑^{n}_{k=0} k!S(n, k)	n!	∑^{n}_{k=0} S(n, k)
OEIS	A002416	A006905	A053763	A006125	A000798	A001035	A000670	A000142	A000110

Note that S(n, k) refers to Stirling numbers of the second kind.

== Philosophical logic ==
Authors in philosophical logic often use different terminology. Reflexive relations in the mathematical sense are called totally reflexive in philosophical logic, and quasi-reflexive relations are called reflexive.
