= Converse relation =

Reversal of the order of elements of a binary relation

In mathematics, the converse of a binary relation is the relation that occurs when the order of the elements is switched in the relation. For example, the converse of the relation 'child of' is the relation 'parent of'. In formal terms, if $X$ and $Y$ are sets and $L \subseteq X \times Y$ is a relation from $X$ to $Y,$ then $L^{\operatorname{T}}$ is the relation defined so that $yL^{\operatorname{T}}x$ if and only if $xLy.$ In set-builder notation,

$$L^{\operatorname{T}} = \{ (y, x) \in Y \times X : (x, y) \in L \}.$$

Since a relation may be represented by a logical matrix, and the logical matrix of the converse relation is the transpose of the original, the converse relation is also called the transpose relation. It has also been called the opposite or dual of the original relation, the inverse of the original relation, or the reciprocal $L^{\circ}$ of the relation $L.$

Other notations for the converse relation include $L^{\operatorname{C}}, L^{-1}, \breve{L}, L^{\circ},$ or $L^{\vee}.$

The notation is analogous with that for an inverse function. Although many functions do not have an inverse, every relation does have a unique converse. The unary operation that maps a relation to the converse relation is an involution, so it induces the structure of a semigroup with involution on the binary relations on a set, or, more generally, induces a dagger category on the category of relations as detailed below. As a unary operation, taking the converse (sometimes called conversion or transposition) commutes with the order-related operations of the calculus of relations, that is it commutes with union, intersection, and complement.

== Examples ==
For the usual (maybe strict or partial) order relations, the converse is the naively expected "opposite" order, for examples, ${\leq^\operatorname{T}} = {\geq},\quad {<^\operatorname{T}} = {>}.$ In order theory the converse of a partial order $\leq$ is typically called its dual and denoted either by $\leq^d$ or by $\leq^{\ast}$.

A relation may be represented by a logical matrix such as
$$\begin{pmatrix}
1 & 1 & 1 & 1 \\
0 & 1 & 0 & 1 \\
0 & 0 & 1 & 0 \\
0 & 0 & 0 & 1
\end{pmatrix}.$$

Then the converse relation is represented by its transpose matrix:
$$\begin{pmatrix}
1 & 0 & 0 & 0 \\
1 & 1 & 0 & 0 \\
1 & 0 & 1 & 0 \\
1 & 1 & 0 & 1
\end{pmatrix}.$$

Many kinship relations in English have converses that are also named. Thus the is-a-child-of relation has as its converse the is-a-parent-of relation. Likewise, the converse of is-a-nephew-or-niece-of is is-an-uncle-or-aunt-of. As for the is-a-sibling-of relation, it is its own converse, since it is a symmetric relation.

== Properties ==
In the monoid of binary endorelations on a set (with the binary operation on relations being the composition of relations), the converse relation does not satisfy the definition of an inverse from group theory, that is, if $L$ is an arbitrary relation on $X,$ then $L \circ L^{\operatorname{T}}$ does not equal the identity relation on $X$ in general. The converse relation does satisfy the (weaker) axioms of a semigroup with involution: $\left(L^{\operatorname{T}}\right)^{\operatorname{T}} = L$ and $(L \circ R)^{\operatorname{T}} = R^{\operatorname{T}} \circ L^{\operatorname{T}}.$

Since one may generally consider relations between different sets (which form a category rather than a monoid, namely the category of relations Rel), in this context the converse relation conforms to the axioms of a dagger category (a.k.a. category with involution). A relation equal to its converse is a symmetric relation; in the language of dagger categories, it is self-adjoint.

Furthermore, the semigroup of endorelations on a set is also a partially ordered structure (with inclusion of relations as sets), and actually an involutive quantale. Similarly, the category of heterogeneous relations, Rel is also an ordered category.

In the calculus of relations, conversion (the unary operation of taking the converse relation) commutes with other binary operations of union and intersection. Conversion also commutes with unary operation of complementation as well as with taking suprema and infima. Conversion is also compatible with the ordering of relations by inclusion.

If a relation is reflexive, irreflexive, symmetric, antisymmetric, asymmetric, transitive, connected, trichotomous, a partial order, total order, strict weak order, total preorder (weak order), or an equivalence relation, its converse is too.

== Inverses ==
If $I$ represents the identity relation, then a relation $R$ may have an inverse as follows: $R$ is called

right-invertible
if there exists a relation $X,$ called a right inverse of $R,$ that satisfies $R \circ X = I.$
left-invertible
if there exists a relation $Y,$ called a left inverse of $R,$ that satisfies $Y \circ R = I.$
invertible
if it is both right-invertible and left-invertible.

For an invertible homogeneous relation $R,$ all right and left inverses coincide; this unique set is called its inverse and it is denoted by $R^{-1}.$ In this case, $R^{-1} = R^{\operatorname{T}}$ holds.

=== Converse relation of a function ===
A function is invertible if and only if its converse relation is a function, in which case the converse relation is the inverse function.

The converse relation of a function $f : X \to Y$ is the relation $f^{-1} \subseteq Y \times X$ defined by the $\operatorname{graph}\, f^{-1} = \{ (y, x) \in Y \times X : y = f(x) \}.$

This is not necessarily a function: One necessary condition is that $f$ be injective, since else $f^{-1}$ is multi-valued. This condition is sufficient for $f^{-1}$ being a partial function, and it is clear that $f^{-1}$ then is a (total) function if and only if $f$ is surjective. In that case, meaning if $f$ is bijective, $f^{-1}$ may be called the inverse function of $f.$

For example, the function $f(x) = 2x + 2$ has the inverse function $f^{-1}(x) = \frac{x}{2} - 1.$

However, the function $g(x) = x^2$ has the inverse relation $g^{-1}(x) = \pm \sqrt{x},$ which is not a function, being multi-valued.

== Composition with relation ==
Using composition of relations, a relation can be composed with its converse.

For the subset relation $\subseteq$ on the power set $\mathcal P(U)$ of a universe $U$, both compositions with its converse are the universal relation on $\mathcal P(U)$:

$$(\subseteq)\circ(\supseteq)=\mathcal P(U)\times\mathcal P(U)
\quad\text{and}\quad
(\supseteq)\circ(\subseteq)=\mathcal P(U)\times\mathcal P(U).$$

Indeed, for any $A,C\subseteq U$,

$$A\big((\subseteq)\circ(\supseteq)\big)C
\iff \exists B\subseteq U:\ A\subseteq B \land C\subseteq B$$

which holds by taking $B=A\cup C$; similarly,

$$A\big((\supseteq)\circ(\subseteq)\big)C
\iff \exists B\subseteq U:\ B\subseteq A \land B\subseteq C,$$

which holds by taking $B=A\cap C$.

Now consider the set membership relation $\in\; \subseteq\ U\times\mathcal P(U)$ and its converse $\ni\; \subseteq\ \mathcal P(U)\times U$. For sets $A,B\subseteq U$,

$$A\,(\ni\circ\in)\,B \iff \exists z\in U:\ z\in A \land z\in B \iff A\cap B\neq\emptyset,$$

so $\ni\circ\in$ is the "nonempty intersection" relation on $\mathcal P(U)$. Conversely, for elements $x,y\in U$,

$$x\,(\in\circ\ni)\,y \iff \exists A\subseteq U:\ x\in A \land y\in A,$$

which always holds (e.g. for $A=\{x,y\}$); hence $\in\circ\ni = U\times U$ is the universal relation on $U$.

The compositions are used to classify relations according to type: for a relation Q, when the identity relation on the range of Q contains Q^{T}Q, then Q is called univalent. When the identity relation on the domain of Q is contained in QQ^{T}, then Q is called total. When Q is both univalent and total then it is a function. When Q^{T} is univalent, then Q is termed injective. When Q^{T} is total, Q is termed surjective.

If Q is univalent, then QQ^{T} is an equivalence relation on the domain of Q, see Transitive relation#Related properties.

== See also ==
- Duality (order theory) – Term in the mathematical area of order theory
- Transpose graph – Directed graph with reversed edges
