= Symmetric relation =

Type of binary relation

Transitive binary relations

	Symmetric	Antisymmetric	Connected	Well-founded	Has joins	Has meets	Reflexive	Irreflexive	Asymmetric
			Total, Semiconnex					Anti- reflexive
Equivalence relation	✓	✗	✗	✗	✗	✗	✓	✗	✗
Preorder (Quasiorder)	✗	✗	✗	✗	✗	✗	✓	✗	✗
Partial order	✗	✓	✗	✗	✗	✗	✓	✗	✗
Total preorder	✗	✗	✓	✗	✗	✗	✓	✗	✗
Total order	✗	✓	✓	✗	✗	✗	✓	✗	✗
Prewellordering	✗	✗	✓	✓	✗	✗	✓	✗	✗
Well-quasi-ordering	✗	✗	✗	✓	✗	✗	✓	✗	✗
Well-ordering	✗	✓	✓	✓	✗	✗	✓	✗	✗
Lattice	✗	✓	✗	✗	✓	✓	✓	✗	✗
Join-semilattice	✗	✓	✗	✗	✓	✗	✓	✗	✗
Meet-semilattice	✗	✓	✗	✗	✗	✓	✓	✗	✗
Strict partial order	✗	✓	✗	✗	✗	✗	✗	✓	✓
Strict weak order	✗	✓	✗	✗	✗	✗	✗	✓	✓
Strict total order	✗	✓	✓	✗	✗	✗	✗	✓	✓
	Symmetric	Antisymmetric	Connected	Well-founded	Has joins	Has meets	Reflexive	Irreflexive	Asymmetric
Definitions, for all $a, b$ and $S\neq\varnothing :$	$$\begin{align}&aRb \\ \Rightarrow{} &bRa\end{align}$$	$$\begin{align}aRb\text{ and }&bRa \\ \Rightarrow a ={} &b\end{align}$$	$$\begin{align}a \neq{} &b \Rightarrow \\ aRb\text{ or }&bRa\end{align}$$	$$\begin{align}\min S \\ \text{exists}\end{align}$$	$$\begin{align}a \vee b \\ \text{exists}\end{align}$$	$$\begin{align}a \wedge b \\ \text{exists}\end{align}$$	$aRa$	$\text{not }aRa$	$$\begin{align}aRb \Rightarrow \\ \text{not }bRa\end{align}$$

✓ indicates that the column's property is always true for the row's term (at the very left), while ✗ indicates that the property is not guaranteed
in general (it might, or might not, hold). For example, that every equivalence relation is symmetric, but not necessarily antisymmetric,
is indicated by ✓ in the "Symmetric" column and ✗ in the "Antisymmetric" column, respectively.

All definitions tacitly require the homogeneous relation $R$ be transitive: for all $a, b, c,$ if $aRb$ and $bRc$ then $aRc.$
A term's definition may require additional properties that are not listed in this table.

A symmetric relation is a type of binary relation. A homogeneous relation $R$ on a set $X$ is symmetric if:

for all $a$ and $b$ in $X$, $a R b$ if and only if $b R a$,

where the notation $a R b$ means that the ordered pair $(a, b)$ is in the relation $R$.

An example is the relation "is equal to", because if a = b is true then b = a is also true. If R^{T} represents the converse of R, then R is symmetric if and only if R = R^{T}.

Symmetry, along with reflexivity and transitivity, are the three defining properties of an equivalence relation.

== Examples ==
=== In mathematics ===
- "is equal to" (equality) (whereas "is less than" is not symmetric)
- "is comparable to", for elements of a partially ordered set
- "... and ... are odd":

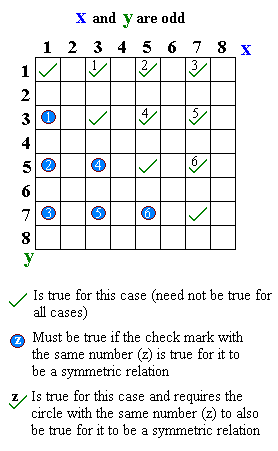

=== Outside mathematics ===
- "is married to" (in most legal systems)
- "is a fully biological sibling of"
- "has coauthored a book with"
- "is a homophone of"
- "is a co-worker of"
- "is a teammate of"

== Relationship to asymmetric and antisymmetric relations ==
Symmetric and antisymmetric relations

By definition, a nonempty relation cannot be both symmetric and asymmetric (where if a is related to b, then b cannot be related to a (in the same way)). However, a relation can be neither symmetric nor asymmetric, which is the case for "is less than or equal to" and "preys on").

Symmetric and antisymmetric (where the only way a can be related to b and b be related to a is if a = b) are actually independent of each other, as these examples show.

Mathematical examples
	Symmetric	Not symmetric
Antisymmetric	equality	divides, less than or equal to
Not antisymmetric	congruence in modular arithmetic	// (integer division), most nontrivial permutations

Non-mathematical examples
	Symmetric	Not symmetric
Antisymmetric	is the same person as, and is married	is the plural of
Not antisymmetric	is a full biological sibling of	preys on

== Properties ==
- A symmetric and transitive relation is always quasireflexive. (Note: If xRy, the yRx by symmetry, hence xRx by transitivity. The proof of xRy ⇒ yRy is similar.)
- One way to count the symmetric relations on n elements, that in their binary matrix representation the upper right triangle determines the relation fully, and it can be arbitrary given, thus there are as many symmetric relations as n × n binary upper triangle matrices, 2^{n(n+1)/2}.

Number of n-element binary relations of different types
Elements	Any	Transitive	Reflexive	Symmetric	Preorder	Partial order	Total preorder	Total order	Equivalence relation
0	1	1	1	1	1	1	1	1	1
1	2	2	1	2	1	1	1	1	1
2	16	13	4	8	4	3	3	2	2
3	512	171	64	64	29	19	13	6	5
4	65,536	3,994	4,096	1,024	355	219	75	24	15
n	2^{n^{2}}		2^{n(n−1)}	2^{n(n+1)/2}			∑^{n}_{k=0} k!S(n, k)	n!	∑^{n}_{k=0} S(n, k)
OEIS	A002416	A006905	A053763	A006125	A000798	A001035	A000670	A000142	A000110

Note that S(n, k) refers to Stirling numbers of the second kind.

== See also ==
- Commutative property – Property of some mathematical operations
- Symmetry in mathematics
- Symmetry – Mathematical invariance under transformations
