= Asymmetric relation =

Binary relation which never occurs in both directions

Transitive binary relations

	Symmetric	Antisymmetric	Connected	Well-founded	Has joins	Has meets	Reflexive	Irreflexive	Asymmetric
			Total, Semiconnex					Anti- reflexive
Equivalence relation	✓	✗	✗	✗	✗	✗	✓	✗	✗
Preorder (Quasiorder)	✗	✗	✗	✗	✗	✗	✓	✗	✗
Partial order	✗	✓	✗	✗	✗	✗	✓	✗	✗
Total preorder	✗	✗	✓	✗	✗	✗	✓	✗	✗
Total order	✗	✓	✓	✗	✗	✗	✓	✗	✗
Prewellordering	✗	✗	✓	✓	✗	✗	✓	✗	✗
Well-quasi-ordering	✗	✗	✗	✓	✗	✗	✓	✗	✗
Well-ordering	✗	✓	✓	✓	✗	✗	✓	✗	✗
Lattice	✗	✓	✗	✗	✓	✓	✓	✗	✗
Join-semilattice	✗	✓	✗	✗	✓	✗	✓	✗	✗
Meet-semilattice	✗	✓	✗	✗	✗	✓	✓	✗	✗
Strict partial order	✗	✓	✗	✗	✗	✗	✗	✓	✓
Strict weak order	✗	✓	✗	✗	✗	✗	✗	✓	✓
Strict total order	✗	✓	✓	✗	✗	✗	✗	✓	✓
	Symmetric	Antisymmetric	Connected	Well-founded	Has joins	Has meets	Reflexive	Irreflexive	Asymmetric
Definitions, for all $a, b$ and $S\neq\varnothing :$	$$\begin{align}&aRb \\ \Rightarrow{} &bRa\end{align}$$	$$\begin{align}aRb\text{ and }&bRa \\ \Rightarrow a ={} &b\end{align}$$	$$\begin{align}a \neq{} &b \Rightarrow \\ aRb\text{ or }&bRa\end{align}$$	$$\begin{align}\min S \\ \text{exists}\end{align}$$	$$\begin{align}a \vee b \\ \text{exists}\end{align}$$	$$\begin{align}a \wedge b \\ \text{exists}\end{align}$$	$aRa$	$\text{not }aRa$	$$\begin{align}aRb \Rightarrow \\ \text{not }bRa\end{align}$$

✓ indicates that the column's property is always true for the row's term (at the very left), while ✗ indicates that the property is not guaranteed
in general (it might, or might not, hold). For example, that every equivalence relation is symmetric, but not necessarily antisymmetric,
is indicated by ✓ in the "Symmetric" column and ✗ in the "Antisymmetric" column, respectively.

All definitions tacitly require the homogeneous relation $R$ be transitive: for all $a, b, c,$ if $aRb$ and $bRc$ then $aRc.$
A term's definition may require additional properties that are not listed in this table.

In mathematics, an asymmetric relation is a binary relation $R$ on a set $X$ where for all $a, b \in X,$ if $a$ is related to $b$ then $b$ is not related to $a.$

== Formal definition ==
=== Preliminaries ===
A binary relation on $X$ is any subset $R$ of $X \times X.$ Given $a, b \in X,$ write $a R b$ if and only if $(a, b) \in R,$ which means that $a R b$ is shorthand for $(a, b) \in R.$ The expression $a R b$ is read as "$a$ is related to $b$ by $R.$"

=== Definition ===
The binary relation $R$ is called asymmetric if for all $a, b \in X,$ if $a R b$ is true then $b R a$ is false; that is, if $(a, b) \in R$ then $(b, a) \not\in R.$ This can be written in the notation of first-order logic as
$$\forall a, b \in X: a R b \implies \lnot(b R a).$$
A logically equivalent definition is:

for all $a, b \in X,$ at least one of $a R b$ and $b R a$ is false,

which in first-order logic can be written as:
$$\forall a, b \in X: \lnot(a R b \wedge b R a).$$
A relation is asymmetric if and only if it is both antisymmetric and irreflexive, so this may also be taken as a definition.

== Examples ==
An example of an asymmetric relation is the "less than" relation $\,<\,$ between real numbers: if $x < y$ then necessarily $y$ is not less than $x.$ More generally, any strict partial order is an asymmetric relation. Not all asymmetric relations are strict partial orders. An example of an asymmetric non-transitive, even antitransitive relation is the rock paper scissors relation: if $X$ beats $Y,$ then $Y$ does not beat $X;$ and if $X$ beats $Y$ and $Y$ beats $Z,$ then $X$ does not beat $Z.$

Restrictions and converses of asymmetric relations are also asymmetric. For example, the restriction of $\,<\,$ from the reals to the integers is still asymmetric, and the converse or dual $\,>\,$ of $\,<\,$ is also asymmetric.

An asymmetric relation need not have the connex property. For example, the strict subset relation $\,\subsetneq\,$ is asymmetric, and neither of the sets $\{1, 2\}$ and $\{3, 4\}$ is a strict subset of the other. A relation is connex if and only if its complement is asymmetric.

A non-example is the "less than or equal" relation $\leq$. This is not asymmetric, because reversing for example, $x \leq x$ produces $x \leq x$ and both are true. The less-than-or-equal relation is an example of a relation that is neither symmetric nor asymmetric, showing that asymmetry is not the same thing as "not symmetric".

The empty relation is the only relation that is (vacuously) both symmetric and asymmetric.

== Properties ==
The following conditions are sufficient for a relation $R$ to be asymmetric:

- $R$ is irreflexive and anti-symmetric (this is also necessary)
- $R$ is irreflexive and transitive. A transitive relation is asymmetric if and only if it is irreflexive: if $aRb$ and $bRa,$ transitivity gives $aRa,$ contradicting irreflexivity. Such a relation is a strict partial order.
- $R$ is irreflexive and satisfies semiorder property 1 (there do not exist two mutually incomparable two-point linear orders)
- $R$ is antitransitive and anti-symmetric
- $R$ is antitransitive and transitive
- $R$ is antitransitive and satisfies semi-order property 1

== See also ==
- Tarski's axiomatization of the reals – part of this is the requirement that $\,<\,$ over the real numbers be asymmetric.
