= The Principles of Mathematics =

Book by Bertrand Russell

- Title page of first edition
- Author: Bertrand Russell
- Translator: Louis Couturat
- Language: English
- Series: I. (all published.)
- Subjects: Foundations of mathematics, Symbolic logic
- Publisher: Cambridge University Press
- Publication date: 1903, 1938, 1951, 1996, and 2009
- Publication place: United Kingdom
- Media type: Print
- Pages: 534 (first edition)
- ISBN: 978-1-313-30597-6 Paperback edition
- OCLC: 1192386
- Website: http://fair-use.org/bertrand-russell/the-principles-of-mathematics/

The Principles of Mathematics (PoM) is a 1903 book by Bertrand Russell, in which the author presented his famous paradox and argued his thesis that mathematics and logic are identical.

The book presents a view of the foundations of mathematics and Meinongianism and has become a classic reference. It reported on developments by Giuseppe Peano, Mario Pieri, Richard Dedekind, Georg Cantor, and others.

In 1905 Louis Couturat published a partial French translation that expanded the book's readership. In 1937 Russell prepared a new introduction saying, "Such interest as the book now possesses is historical, and consists in the fact that it represents a certain stage in the development of its subject." Further editions were published in 1938, 1951, 1996, and 2009.

== Contents ==
The Principles of Mathematics consists of 59 chapters divided into seven parts: indefinables in mathematics, number, quantity, order, infinity and continuity, space, matter and motion.

In chapter one, "Definition of Pure Mathematics", Russell asserts that:

The fact that all Mathematics is Symbolic Logic is one of the greatest discoveries of our age; and when this fact has been established, the remainder of the principles of mathematics consists in the analysis of Symbolic Logic itself.

Russell deconstructs pure mathematics with relations, by positing them, their converses and complements as primitive notions. Combining the calculus of relations of DeMorgan, Pierce and Schroder, with the symbolic logic of Peano, he analyses orders using serial relations, and writes that the theorems of measurement have been generalized to order theory. He notes that Peano distinguished a term from the set containing it: the set membership relation versus subset. Epsilon (ε) is used to show set membership, but Russell indicates trouble when $x \epsilon x.$ Russell's paradox is mentioned 15 times and chapter 10 "The Contradiction" explains it. Russell had written previously on foundations of geometry, denoting, and relativism of space and time, so those topics are recounted. Elliptic geometry according to Clifford, and the Cayley-Klein metric are mentioned to illustrate non-Euclidean geometry. There is an anticipation of relativity physics in the final part as the last three chapters consider Newton's laws of motion, absolute and relative motion, and Hertz's dynamics. However, Russell rejects what he calls "the relational theory", and says on page 489:

For us, since absolute space and time have been admitted, there is no need to avoid absolute motion, and indeed no possibility of doing so.

In his review, G. H. Hardy says "Mr. Russell is a firm believer in absolute position in space and time, a view as much out of fashion nowadays that Chapter [58: Absolute and Relative Motion] will be read with peculiar interest."

== Early reviews ==
Reviews were prepared by G. E. Moore and Charles Sanders Peirce, but Moore's was never published and that of Peirce was brief and somewhat dismissive. He indicated that he thought it unoriginal, saying that the book "can hardly be called literature" and "Whoever wishes a convenient introduction to the remarkable researches into the logic of mathematics that have been made during the last sixty years [...] will do well to take up this book."

G. H. Hardy wrote a favorable review expecting the book to appeal more to philosophers than mathematicians. But he says:

In spite of its five hundred pages the book is much too short. Many chapters dealing with important questions are compressed into five or six pages, and in some places, especially in the most avowedly controversial parts, the argument is almost too condensed to follow. And the philosopher who attempts to read the book will be especially puzzled by the constant presupposition of a whole philosophical system utterly unlike any of those usually accepted.

In 1904 another review appeared in Bulletin of the American Mathematical Society (11(2):74–93) written by Edwin Bidwell Wilson. He says "The delicacy of the question is such that even the greatest mathematicians and philosophers of to-day have made what seem to be substantial slips of judgement and have shown on occasions an astounding ignorance of the essence of the problem which they were discussing. ... all too frequently it has been the result of a wholly unpardonable disregard of the work already accomplished by others." Wilson recounts the developments of Peano that Russell reports, and takes the occasion to correct Henri Poincaré who had ascribed them to David Hilbert. In praise of Russell, Wilson says "Surely the present work is a monument to patience, perseverance, and thoroughness." (page 88)

== Second edition ==
In 1938 the book was re-issued with a new preface by Russell. This preface was interpreted as a retreat from the realism of the first edition and a turn toward nominalist philosophy of symbolic logic. James Feibleman, an admirer of the book, thought Russell's new preface went too far into nominalism so he wrote a rebuttal to this introduction. Feibleman says, "It is the first comprehensive treatise on symbolic logic to be written in English; and it gives to that system of logic a realistic interpretation."

== Later reviews ==
In 1959 Russell wrote My Philosophical Development, in which he recalled the impetus to write the Principles:

It was at the International Congress of Philosophy in Paris in the year 1900 that I became aware of the importance of logical reform for the philosophy of mathematics. ... I was impressed by the fact that, in every discussion, [Peano] showed more precision and more logical rigour than was shown by anybody else. ... It was [Peano's works] that gave the impetus to my own views on the principles of mathematics.

Recalling the book as it his later work, he provides this evaluation:

The Principles of Mathematics, which I finished on 23 May 1902, turned out to be a crude and rather immature draft of the subsequent work [Principia Mathematica], from which, however, it differed in containing controversy with other philosophies of mathematics.

Such self-deprecation from the author after half a century of philosophical growth is understandable. On the other hand, Jules Vuillemin wrote in 1968:

The Principles inaugurated contemporary philosophy. Other works have won and lost the title. Such is not the case with this one. It is serious, and its wealth perseveres. Furthermore, in relation to it, in a deliberate fashion or not, it locates itself again today in the eyes of all those that believe that contemporary science has modified our representation of the universe and through this representation, our relation to ourselves and to others.

Moreover, in the same reflection, Russell also recounts the singular place the composition of the book had in his intellectual life. He recalls:

I finished this first draft of The Principles of Mathematics on the last day of the nineteenth century—i.e. December 31, 1900. The months since the previous July had been an intellectual honeymoon such as I have never experienced before or since. Every day I found myself understanding something that I had not understood on the previous day. I thought all difficulties were solved and all problems were at an end.

When W. V. O. Quine penned his autobiography, he wrote:

Peano's symbolic notation took Russell by storm in 1900, but Russell's Principles was still in unrelieved prose. I was inspired by its profundity [in 1928] and baffled by its frequent opacity. In part it was rough going because of the cumbersomeness of ordinary language as compared with the suppleness of a notation especially devised for these intricate themes. Rereading it years later, I discovered that it had been rough going also because matters were unclear in Russell's own mind in those pioneer days.

The Principles was an early expression of analytic philosophy and thus has come under close examination. Peter Hylton wrote, "The book has an air of excitement and novelty to it ... The salient characteristic of Principles is ... the way in which the technical work is integrated into metaphysical argument."

Ivor Grattan-Guinness made an in-depth study of Principles. First he published Dear Russell – Dear Jourdain (1977), which included correspondence with Philip Jourdain who promulgated some of the book's ideas. Then in 2000 Grattan-Guinness published The Search for Mathematical Roots 1870 – 1940, which considered the author's circumstances, the book's composition and its shortcomings.

In 2006, Philip Ehrlich challenged the validity of Russell's analysis of infinitesimals in the Leibniz tradition. A recent study documents the non-sequiturs in Russell's critique of the infinitesimals of Gottfried Leibniz and Hermann Cohen.

== See also ==
- Introduction to Mathematical Philosophy
- Russellian change
