= Homogeneous relation =

Binary relation over a set and itself

In mathematics, a homogeneous relation (also called endorelation) on a set X is a binary relation between X and itself, i.e. it is a subset of the Cartesian product X × X. This is commonly phrased as "a relation on X" or "a (binary) relation over X". An example of a homogeneous relation is the relation of kinship, where the relation is between people.

Common types of endorelations include orders, graphs, and equivalences. Specialized studies of order theory and graph theory have developed understanding of endorelations. Terminology particular for graph theory is used for description, with an ordinary (undirected) graph presumed to correspond to a symmetric relation, and a general endorelation corresponding to a directed graph. An endorelation R corresponds to a logical matrix of 0s and 1s, where the expression xRy (x is R-related to y) corresponds to an edge between x and y in the graph, and to a 1 in the square matrix of R. It is called an adjacency matrix in graph terminology.

== Particular homogeneous relations ==
Some particular homogeneous relations over a set X (with arbitrary elements x_{1}, x_{2}) are:

Empty relation
E = ∅;
that is, x_{1}Ex_{2} holds never;
Universal relation
U = X × X;
that is, x_{1}Ux_{2} holds always;
Identity relation (see also Identity function)
I = {(x, x) | x ∈ X};
that is, x_{1}Ix_{2} holds if and only if x_{1} = x_{2}.

=== Example ===
Matrix representation of the relation "is adjacent to" on the set of tectonic plates
		Af	An	Ar	Au	Ca	Co	Eu	In	Ju	NA	Na	Pa	Ph	SA	Sc	So
African	Af	Yes	Yes	Yes	No	No	No	Yes	No	No	Yes	No	No	No	Yes	No	Yes
Antarctic	An	Yes	Yes	No	Yes	No	No	No	No	No	No	Yes	Yes	No	Yes	Yes	Yes
Arabian	Ar	Yes	No	Yes	No	No	No	Yes	Yes	No	No	No	No	No	No	No	Yes
Australian	Au	No	Yes	No	Yes	No	No	Yes	Yes	No	No	No	Yes	No	No	No	Yes
Caribbean	Ca	No	No	No	No	Yes	Yes	No	No	No	Yes	Yes	No	No	Yes	No	No
Cocos	Co	No	No	No	No	Yes	Yes	No	No	No	Yes	Yes	Yes	No	No	No	No
Eurasian	Eu	Yes	No	Yes	Yes	No	No	Yes	Yes	No	Yes	No	No	Yes	No	No	No
Indian	In	No	No	Yes	Yes	No	No	Yes	Yes	No	No	No	No	No	No	No	Yes
Juan de Fuca	Ju	No	No	No	No	No	No	No	No	Yes	Yes	No	Yes	No	No	No	No
North american	NA	Yes	No	No	No	Yes	Yes	Yes	No	Yes	Yes	No	Yes	Yes	Yes	No	No
Nazca	Na	No	Yes	No	No	Yes	Yes	No	No	No	No	Yes	Yes	No	Yes	No	No
Pacific	Pa	No	Yes	No	Yes	No	Yes	No	No	Yes	Yes	Yes	Yes	Yes	No	No	No
Philippine	Ph	No	No	No	No	No	No	Yes	No	No	Yes	No	Yes	Yes	No	No	No
South american	SA	Yes	Yes	No	No	Yes	No	No	No	No	Yes	Yes	No	No	Yes	Yes	No
Scotia	Sc	No	Yes	No	No	No	No	No	No	No	No	No	No	No	Yes	Yes	No
Somali	So	Yes	Yes	Yes	Yes	No	No	No	Yes	No	No	No	No	No	No	No	Yes

The binary relation that describes whether two tectonic plates are in contact is a homogenous relation, because both the first and second argument are from the same set, that is the set of tectonic plates on Earth.

Sixteen large tectonic plates of the Earth's crust contact each other in a homogeneous relation. The relation can be expressed as a logical matrix with 1 (depicted "") indicating contact and 0 ("") no contact. This example expresses a symmetric relation.

== Properties ==
Some important properties that a homogeneous relation R over a set X may have are:

Reflexive
for all x ∈ X, xRx. For example, ≥ is a reflexive relation but > is not.
Irreflexive (or strict)
for all x ∈ X, not xRx. For example, > is an irreflexive relation, but ≥ is not.
Coreflexive
for all x, y ∈ X, if xRy then x = y. For example, the relation over the integers in which each odd number is related to itself is a coreflexive relation. The equality relation is the only example of a both reflexive and coreflexive relation, and any coreflexive relation is a subset of the identity relation.
Left quasi-reflexive
for all x, y ∈ X, if xRy then xRx.
Right quasi-reflexive
for all x, y ∈ X, if xRy then yRy.
Quasi-reflexive
for all x, y ∈ X, if xRy then xRx and yRy. A relation is quasi-reflexive if, and only if, it is both left and right quasi-reflexive.

The previous 6 alternatives are far from being exhaustive; e.g., the binary relation xRy defined by y = x^{2} is neither irreflexive, nor coreflexive, nor reflexive, since it contains the pair (0, 0), and (2, 4), but not (2, 2), respectively. The latter two facts also rule out (any kind of) quasi-reflexivity.

Symmetric
for all x, y ∈ X, if xRy then yRx. For example, "is a blood relative of" is a symmetric relation, because x is a blood relative of y if and only if y is a blood relative of x.
Antisymmetric
for all x, y ∈ X, if xRy and yRx then x = y. For example, ≥ is an antisymmetric relation; so is >, but vacuously (the condition in the definition is always false).
Asymmetric
for all x, y ∈ X, if xRy then not yRx. A relation is asymmetric if and only if it is both antisymmetric and irreflexive. For example, > is an asymmetric relation, but ≥ is not.

Again, the previous 3 alternatives are far from being exhaustive; as an example over the natural numbers, the relation xRy defined by x > 2 is neither symmetric nor antisymmetric, let alone asymmetric.

Transitive
for all x, y, z ∈ X, if xRy and yRz then xRz. A transitive relation is irreflexive if and only if it is asymmetric. For example, "is ancestor of" is a transitive relation, while "is parent of" is not.
Antitransitive
for all x, y, z ∈ X, if xRy and yRz then never xRz.
Co-transitive
if the complement of R is transitive. That is, for all x, y, z ∈ X, if xRz, then xRy or yRz. This is used in pseudo-orders in constructive mathematics.
Quasitransitive
for all x, y, z ∈ X, if xRy and yRz but neither yRx nor zRy, then xRz but not zRx.
Transitivity of incomparability
for all x, y, z ∈ X, if x and y are incomparable with respect to R and if the same is true of y and z, then x and z are also incomparable with respect to R. This is used in weak orderings.

Again, the previous 5 alternatives are not exhaustive. For example, the relation xRy if (y = 0 or y = x+1) satisfies none of these properties. On the other hand, the empty relation trivially satisfies all of them.

Dense
for all x, y ∈ X such that xRy, there exists some z ∈ X such that xRz and zRy. This is used in dense orders.
Connected
for all x, y ∈ X, if x ≠ y then xRy or yRx. This property is sometimes called "total", which is distinct from the definitions of "left/right-total" given below.
Strongly connected
for all x, y ∈ X, xRy or yRx. This property, too, is sometimes called "total", which is distinct from the definitions of "left/right-total" given below.
Trichotomous
for all x, y ∈ X, exactly one of xRy, yRx or x = y holds. For example, > is a trichotomous relation on the real numbers, while the relation "divides" over the natural numbers is not.
Right Euclidean (or just Euclidean)
for all x, y, z ∈ X, if xRy and xRz then yRz. For example, = is a Euclidean relation because if x = y and x = z then y = z.
Left Euclidean
for all x, y, z ∈ X, if yRx and zRx then yRz.
Well-founded
every nonempty subset S of X contains a minimal element with respect to R. Well-foundedness implies the descending chain condition (that is, no infinite chain ... x_{n}R...Rx_{3}Rx_{2}Rx_{1} can exist). If the axiom of dependent choice is assumed, both conditions are equivalent.

Moreover, all properties of binary relations in general also may apply to homogeneous relations:

Set-like
for all x ∈ X, the class of all y such that yRx is a set. (This makes sense only if relations over proper classes are allowed.)
Left-unique
for all x, z ∈ X and all y ∈ Y, if xRy and zRy then x = z.
Univalent
for all x ∈ X and all y, z ∈ Y, if xRy and xRz then y = z.
Total (also called left-total)
for all x ∈ X there exists a y ∈ Y such that xRy. This property is different from the definition of connected (also called total by some authors).
Surjective (also called right-total)
for all y ∈ Y, there exists an x ∈ X such that xRy.

A preorder is a relation that is reflexive and transitive. A total preorder, also called linear preorder or weak order, is a relation that is reflexive, transitive, and connected.

A partial order, also called order, is a relation that is reflexive, antisymmetric, and transitive. A strict partial order, also called strict order, is a relation that is irreflexive, antisymmetric, and transitive. A total order, also called linear order, simple order, or chain, is a relation that is reflexive, antisymmetric, transitive and connected. A strict total order, also called strict linear order, strict simple order, or strict chain, is a relation that is irreflexive, antisymmetric, transitive and connected.

A partial equivalence relation is a relation that is symmetric and transitive. An equivalence relation is a relation that is reflexive, symmetric, and transitive. It is also a relation that is symmetric, transitive, and total, since these properties imply reflexivity.

A univalent relation may also be called a partial function. A (total) function is a partial function that is left-total. An injective function (or partial function) is one whose inverse is univalent. A surjective function is one that is right-total.

Implications and conflicts between properties of homogeneous binary relations

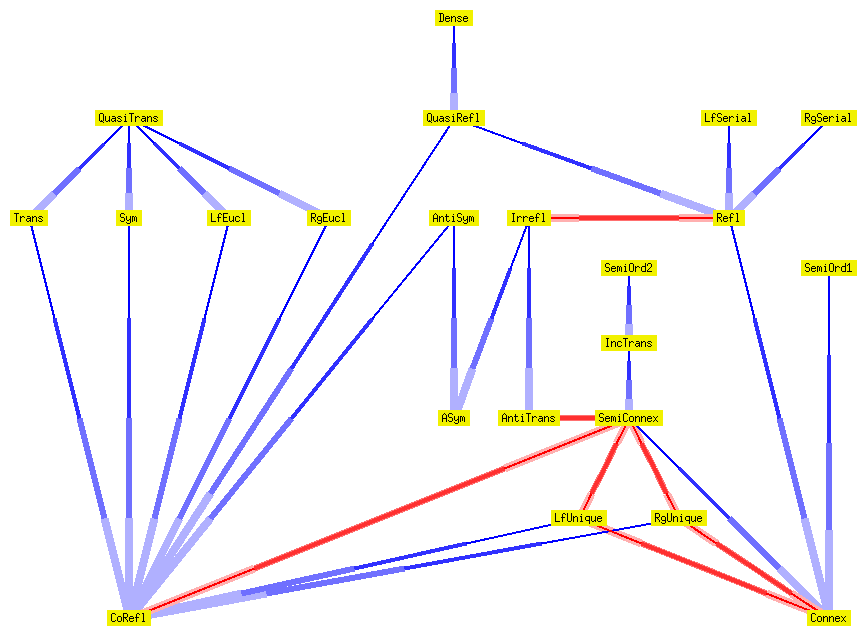
Implications (blue) and conflicts (red) between properties (yellow) of homogeneous binary relations. For example, every asymmetric relation is irreflexive ("ASym ⇒ Irrefl"), and no relation on a non-empty set can be both irreflexive and reflexive ("Irrefl # Refl"). Omitting the red edges results in a Hasse diagram.

== Operations ==
If R is a homogeneous relation over a set X then each of the following is a homogeneous relation over X:

Reflexive closure, R^{=}
Defined as R^{=} = {(x, x) | x ∈ X} ∪ R or the smallest reflexive relation over X containing R. This can be proven to be equal to the intersection of all reflexive relations containing R.
Reflexive reduction, R^{≠}
Defined as R^{≠} = R \ {(x, x) | x ∈ X} or the largest irreflexive relation over X contained in R.
Transitive closure, R^{+}
Defined as the smallest transitive relation over X containing R. This can be seen to be equal to the intersection of all transitive relations containing R.
Reflexive transitive closure, R*
Defined as R* = (R^{+})^{=}, the smallest preorder containing R.
Reflexive transitive symmetric closure, R^{≡}
Defined as the smallest equivalence relation over X containing R.

All operations defined in Binary relation § Operations also apply to homogeneous relations.

Homogeneous relations by property
	Reflexivity	Symmetry	Transitivity	Connectedness	Symbol	Example
Directed graph					→	
Undirected graph		Symmetric				
Dependency	Reflexive	Symmetric				
Tournament	Irreflexive	Asymmetric				Pecking order
Preorder	Reflexive		Transitive		≤	Preference
Total preorder	Reflexive		Transitive	Connected	≤	
Partial order	Reflexive	Antisymmetric	Transitive		≤	Subset
Strict partial order	Irreflexive	Asymmetric	Transitive		<	Strict subset
Total order	Reflexive	Antisymmetric	Transitive	Connected	≤	Alphabetical order
Strict total order	Irreflexive	Asymmetric	Transitive	Connected	<	Strict alphabetical order
Partial equivalence relation		Symmetric	Transitive			
Equivalence relation	Reflexive	Symmetric	Transitive		~, ≡	Equality

== Enumeration ==
The set of all homogeneous relations $\mathcal{B}(X)$ over a set X is the set 2^{X×X}, which is a Boolean algebra augmented with the involution of mapping of a relation to its converse relation. Considering composition of relations as a binary operation on $\mathcal{B}(X)$, it forms a monoid with involution where the identity element is the identity relation.

The number of distinct homogeneous relations over an n-element set is 2^{n^{2}} (sequence A002416 in the OEIS):

Number of n-element binary relations of different types
Elements	Any	Transitive	Reflexive	Symmetric	Preorder	Partial order	Total preorder	Total order	Equivalence relation
0	1	1	1	1	1	1	1	1	1
1	2	2	1	2	1	1	1	1	1
2	16	13	4	8	4	3	3	2	2
3	512	171	64	64	29	19	13	6	5
4	65,536	3,994	4,096	1,024	355	219	75	24	15
n	2^{n^{2}}		2^{n(n−1)}	2^{n(n+1)/2}			∑^{n}_{k=0} k!S(n, k)	n!	∑^{n}_{k=0} S(n, k)
OEIS	A002416	A006905	A053763	A006125	A000798	A001035	A000670	A000142	A000110

Note that S(n, k) refers to Stirling numbers of the second kind.

Notes:

- The number of irreflexive relations is the same as that of reflexive relations.
- The number of strict partial orders (irreflexive transitive relations) is the same as that of partial orders.
- The number of strict weak orders is the same as that of total preorders.
- The total orders are the partial orders that are also total preorders. The number of preorders that are neither a partial order nor a total preorder is, therefore, the number of preorders, minus the number of partial orders, minus the number of total preorders, plus the number of total orders: 0, 0, 0, 3, and 85, respectively.
- The number of equivalence relations is the number of partitions, which is the Bell number.

The homogeneous relations can be grouped into pairs (relation, complement), except that for n = 0 the relation is its own complement. The non-symmetric ones can be grouped into quadruples (relation, complement, inverse, inverse complement).

== Examples ==
- Order relations, including strict orders:
  - Greater than
  - Greater than or equal to
  - Less than
  - Less than or equal to
  - Divides (evenly)
  - Subset of
- Equivalence relations:
  - Equality
  - Parallel with (for affine spaces)
  - Equinumerosity or "is in bijection with"
  - Isomorphic
  - Equipollent line segments
- Tolerance relation, a reflexive and symmetric relation:
  - Dependency relation, a finite tolerance relation
  - Independency relation, the complement of some dependency relation
- Kinship relations

== Generalizations ==
- A binary relation in general need not be homogeneous, it is defined to be a subset R ⊆ X × Y for arbitrary sets X and Y.
- A finitary relation is a subset R ⊆ X_{1} × ... × X_{n} for some natural number n and arbitrary sets X_{1}, ..., X_{n}, it is also called an n-ary relation.
