= Rewriting =

Replacing subterm in a formula with another term

In mathematics, linguistics, computer science, and logic, rewriting covers a wide range of methods of replacing subterms of a formula with other terms. Such methods may be achieved by rewriting systems (also known as rewrite systems, rewrite engines, or reduction systems). In their most basic form, they consist of a set of objects, plus relations on how to transform those objects.

Rewriting can be non-deterministic. One rule to rewrite a term could be applied in many different ways to that term, or more than one rule could be applicable. Rewriting systems then do not provide an algorithm for changing one term to another, but a set of possible rule applications. When combined with an appropriate algorithm, however, rewrite systems can be viewed as computer programs, and several theorem provers and declarative programming languages are based on term rewriting.

== Example cases ==
=== Logic ===
In (classical) logic, the procedure for obtaining the conjunctive normal form (CNF) of a formula can be implemented as a rewriting system. For example, the rules of such a system would be:

$\neg\neg A \to A$ (double negation elimination)
$\neg(A \land B) \to \neg A \lor \neg B$ (De Morgan's laws)
$$\neg(A \lor B)  \to \neg A \land\neg B$$
$(A \land B) \lor C \to (A \lor C) \land (B \lor C)$ (distributivity)
$A \lor (B \land C) \to (A \lor B) \land (A \lor C),$ (Note: This variant of the previous rule is needed since the commutative law A∨B = B∨A cannot be turned into a rewrite rule. A rule like A∨B → B∨A would cause the rewrite system to be nonterminating.)

For each rule, each variable denotes a subexpression, and the symbol ($\to$) indicates that an expression matching the left hand side of it can be rewritten to one matching the right hand side of it. In such a system, each rule is a logical equivalence, so performing a rewrite on an expression by these rules does not change the truth value of it. Other useful rewriting systems in logic may not preserve truth values, see e.g. equisatisfiability. (Note: In intuitionistic logic only some of these rules are equivalences. The rule $\neg(A \lor B) \to \neg A \land \neg B$ and both distributive laws remain valid, but double negation elimination and the rule $\neg(A \land B) \to \neg A \lor \neg B$ do not: in each case the right-hand side implies the left-hand side, but not conversely. Double negation elimination can be replaced by the valid rule $\neg\neg\neg A \to \neg A$, but negations can then remain in front of conjunctions and double negations, so the system does not in general produce an intuitionistically equivalent conjunctive normal form. By Glivenko's theorem, however, a propositional formula $A$ and its classical conjunctive normal form $C$ satisfy $\neg\neg A \leftrightarrow \neg\neg C$ intuitionistically. Mints showed that, by introducing fresh atoms in the manner of the Tseytin transformation, intuitionistic propositional derivability can be reduced to sets of clauses of the forms $(p_1 \land \dots \land p_n) \to (q_1 \lor \dots \lor q_m)$ and $(p \to q) \to r$.)

=== Arithmetic ===
Term rewriting systems can be employed to compute arithmetic operations on natural numbers. To this end, each such number has to be encoded as a term. The simplest encoding is the one used in the Peano axioms, based on the constant 0 (zero) and the successor function S. For example, the numbers 0, 1, 2, and 3 are represented by the terms 0, S(0), S(S(0)), and S(S(S(0))), respectively. The following term rewriting system can then be used to compute sum and product of given natural numbers.

$$\begin{align}
A + 0        &\to A               & \textrm{(1)}, \\
A + S(B)     &\to S (A + B)       & \textrm{(2)}, \\
A \cdot 0    &\to 0               & \textrm{(3)}, \\
A \cdot S(B) &\to A + (A \cdot B) & \textrm{(4)}.
\end{align}$$

For example, the computation of 2+2 to result in 4 can be duplicated by term rewriting as follows:

$S(S(0)) + S(S(0))$ $\;\;\stackrel{(2)}{\to}\;\;$ $S( \; S(S(0)) + S(0) \; )$ $\;\;\stackrel{(2)}{\to}\;\;$ $S(S( \; S(S(0)) + 0 \; ))$ $\;\;\stackrel{(1)}{\to}\;\;$ $S(S( S(S(0)) )),$

where the notation above each arrow indicates the rule used for each rewrite.

As another example, the computation of 2⋅2 looks like:

$S(S(0)) \cdot S(S(0))$ $\;\;\stackrel{(4)}{\to}\;\;$ $S(S(0)) + S(S(0)) \cdot S(0)$ $\;\;\stackrel{(4)}{\to}\;\;$ $S(S(0)) + S(S(0)) + S(S(0)) \cdot 0$ $\;\;\stackrel{(3)}{\to}\;\;$ $S(S(0)) + S(S(0)) + 0$ $\;\;\stackrel{(1)}{\to}\;\;$ $S(S(0)) + S(S(0))$ $\;\;\stackrel{\textrm{s.a.}}{\to}\;\;$ $S(S( S(S(0)) )),$

where the last step comprises the previous example computation.

=== Linguistics ===
In linguistics, phrase structure rules, also called rewrite rules, are used in some systems of generative grammar, as a means of generating the grammatically correct sentences of a language. Such a rule typically takes the form $\rm A \rightarrow X$, where A is a syntactic category label, such as noun phrase or sentence, and X is a sequence of such labels or morphemes, expressing the fact that A can be replaced by X in generating the constituent structure of a sentence. For example, the rule $\rm S \rightarrow NP\ VP$ means that a sentence can consist of a noun phrase (NP) followed by a verb phrase (VP); further rules will specify what sub-constituents a noun phrase and a verb phrase can consist of, and so on.

== Abstract rewriting systems ==
From the above examples, it is clear that we can think of rewriting systems in an abstract manner. We need to specify a set of objects and the rules that can be applied to transform them. The most general (unidimensional) setting of this notion is called an abstract reduction system or abstract rewriting system (abbreviated ARS). An ARS is simply a set A of objects, together with a binary relation → on A called the reduction relation, rewrite relation or just reduction.

Many notions and notations can be defined in the general setting of an ARS. $\overset{*}\rightarrow$ is the reflexive transitive closure of $\rightarrow$. $\leftrightarrow$ is the symmetric closure of $\rightarrow$. $\overset{*}{\leftrightarrow}$ is the reflexive transitive symmetric closure of $\rightarrow$. The word problem for an ARS is determining, given x and y, whether $x \overset{*}{\leftrightarrow} y$. An object x in A is called reducible if there exists some other y in A such that $x \rightarrow y$; otherwise it is called irreducible or a normal form. An object y is called a "normal form of x" if $x \stackrel{*}{\rightarrow} y$, and y is irreducible. If the normal form of x is unique, then this is usually denoted with $x{\downarrow}$. If every object has at least one normal form, the ARS is called normalizing. $x \downarrow y$ or x and y are said to be joinable if there exists some z with the property that $x \overset{*}{\rightarrow} z \overset{*}{\leftarrow} y$. An ARS is said to possess the Church–Rosser property if $x \overset{*}{\leftrightarrow} y$ implies $x \downarrow y$. An ARS is confluent if for all w, x, and y in A, $x \overset{*}{\leftarrow} w \overset{*}{\rightarrow} y$ implies $x \downarrow y$. An ARS is locally confluent if and only if for all w, x, and y in A, $x \leftarrow w \rightarrow y$ implies $x\mathbin\downarrow y$. An ARS is said to be terminating or noetherian if there is no infinite chain $x_0 \rightarrow x_1 \rightarrow x_2 \rightarrow \cdots$. A confluent and terminating ARS is called convergent or canonical.

Important theorems for abstract rewriting systems are that an ARS is confluent iff it has the Church–Rosser property, Newman's lemma (a terminating ARS is confluent if and only if it is locally confluent), and that the word problem for an ARS is undecidable in general.

== String rewriting systems ==
A string rewriting system (SRS), also known as semi-Thue system, exploits the free monoid structure of the strings (words) over an alphabet to extend a rewriting relation, $R$, to all strings in the alphabet that contain left- and respectively right-hand sides of some rules as substrings. Formally a semi-Thue system is a tuple $(\Sigma, R)$ where $\Sigma$ is a (usually finite) alphabet, and $R$ is a binary relation between some (fixed) strings in the alphabet, called the set of rewrite rules. The one-step rewriting relation $\underset{R}\rightarrow$ induced by $R$ on $\Sigma^*$ is defined as: if $s, t \in \Sigma^*$ are any strings, then $s \underset{R}\rightarrow t$ if there exist $x, y, u, v \in \Sigma^*$ such that $s = xuy$, $t = xvy$, and $u R v$. Since $\underset{R}\rightarrow$ is a relation on $\Sigma^*$, the pair $(\Sigma^*, \underset{R}\rightarrow)$ fits the definition of an abstract rewriting system. Since the empty string is in $\Sigma^*$, $R$ is a subset of $\underset{R}\rightarrow$. If the relation $R$ is symmetric, then the system is called a Thue system.

In a SRS, the reduction relation $\overset{*}\underset{R}\rightarrow$ is compatible with the monoid operation, meaning that $x \overset{*}\underset{R}\rightarrow y$ implies $uxv \overset{*}\underset{R}\rightarrow uyv$ for all strings $x, y, u, v \in \Sigma^*$. Similarly, the reflexive transitive symmetric closure of $\underset{R}\rightarrow$, denoted $\overset{*}{\underset R \leftrightarrow}$, is a congruence, meaning it is an equivalence relation (by definition) and it is also compatible with string concatenation. The relation $\overset{*}\underset{R} \leftrightarrow$ is called the Thue congruence generated by $R$. In a Thue system, i.e. if $R$ is symmetric, the rewrite relation $\overset{*}\underset{R}\rightarrow$ coincides with the Thue congruence $\overset{*}{\underset R \leftrightarrow}$.

The notion of a semi-Thue system essentially coincides with the presentation of a monoid. Since $\overset{*}{\underset R \leftrightarrow}$ is a congruence, we can define the factor monoid $\mathcal{M}_R = \Sigma^*/\overset{*}{\underset R \leftrightarrow}$ of the free monoid $\Sigma^*$ by the Thue congruence. If a monoid $\mathcal{M}$ is isomorphic with $\mathcal{M}_R$, then the semi-Thue system $(\Sigma, R)$ is called a monoid presentation of $\mathcal{M}$.

We immediately get some very useful connections with other areas of algebra. For example, the alphabet $\{ a,b \}$ with the rules $\{ ab \rightarrow \varepsilon, ba \rightarrow \varepsilon \}$, where $\varepsilon$ is the empty string, is a presentation of the free group on one generator. If instead the rules are just $\{ ab \rightarrow \varepsilon \}$, then we obtain a presentation of the bicyclic monoid. Thus semi-Thue systems constitute a natural framework for solving the word problem for monoids and groups. In fact, every monoid has a presentation of the form $(\Sigma, R)$, i.e. it may always be presented by a semi-Thue system, possibly over an infinite alphabet.

The word problem for a semi-Thue system is undecidable in general; this result is sometimes known as the Post–Markov theorem.

== Term rewriting systems ==
Pic.1: Schematic triangle diagram of application of a rewrite rule $l \longrightarrow r$ at position $p$ in a term, with matching substitution $\sigma$

Pic.2: Rule lhs term $x*(y*z)$ matching in term $\frac{a*((a+1)*(a+2))}{1*(2*3)}$

A term rewriting system (TRS) is a rewriting system whose objects are terms, which are expressions with nested sub-expressions. For example, the system shown under § Logic above is a term rewriting system. The terms in this system are composed of binary operators $(\vee)$ and $(\wedge)$ and the unary operator $(\neg)$. Also present in the rules are variables, which represent any possible term (though a single variable always represents the same term throughout a single rule).

In contrast to string rewriting systems, whose objects are sequences of symbols, the objects of a term rewriting system form a term algebra. A term can be visualized as a tree of symbols, the set of admitted symbols being fixed by a given signature. As a formalism, term rewriting systems have the full power of Turing machines, that is, every computable function can be defined by a term rewriting system.

Some programming languages are based on term rewriting. One such example is Pure, a functional programming language for mathematical applications.

=== Formal definition ===
A rewrite rule is a pair of terms, commonly written as $l \rightarrow r$, to indicate that the left-hand side l can be replaced by the right-hand side r. A term rewriting system is a set R of such rules. A rule $l \rightarrow r$ can be applied to a term s if the left term l matches some subterm of s, that is, if there is some substitution $\sigma$ such that the subterm of $s$ rooted at some position p is the result of applying the substitution $\sigma$ to the term l. The subterm matching the left hand side of the rule is called a redex or reducible expression. The result term t of this rule application is then the result of replacing the subterm at position p in s by the term $r$ with the substitution $\sigma$ applied, see picture 1. In this case, $s$ is said to be rewritten in one step, or rewritten directly, to $t$ by the system $R$, formally denoted as $s \rightarrow_R t$, $s \underset{R}\rightarrow t$, or as $s \overset{R}\rightarrow t$ by some authors.

If a term $t_1$ can be rewritten in several steps into a term $t_n$, that is, if $t_1 \underset{R}\rightarrow t_2 \underset{R}\rightarrow \cdots \underset{R}\rightarrow t_n$, the term $t_1$ is said to be rewritten to $t_n$, formally denoted as $t_1 \overset{+}\underset{R}\rightarrow t_n$. In other words, the relation $\overset{+}\underset{R}\rightarrow$ is the transitive closure of the relation $\underset{R}\rightarrow$; often, also the notation $\overset{*}\underset{R}\rightarrow$ is used to denote the reflexive-transitive closure of $\underset{R}\rightarrow$, that is, $s \overset{*}\underset{R}\rightarrow t$ if $s = t$ or $s \overset{+}\underset{R}\rightarrow t$. A term rewriting given by a set $R$ of rules can be viewed as an abstract rewriting system as defined above, with terms as its objects and $\underset{R}\rightarrow$ as its rewrite relation.

For example, $x*(y*z) \rightarrow (x*y)*z$ is a rewrite rule, commonly used to establish a normal form with respect to the associativity of $*$. That rule can be applied at the numerator in the term $\frac{a*((a+1)*(a+2))}{1*(2*3)}$ with the matching substitution $\{ x \mapsto a, \; y \mapsto a+1, \; z \mapsto a+2 \}$, see picture 2. (Note: since applying that substitution to the rule's left hand side $x*(y*z)$ yields the numerator $a*((a+1)*(a+2))$) Applying that substitution to the rule's right-hand side yields the term $(a*(a+1))*(a+2)$, and replacing the numerator by that term yields $\frac{(a*(a+1))*(a+2)}{1*(2*3)}$, which is the result term of applying the rewrite rule. Altogether, applying the rewrite rule has achieved what is called "applying the associativity law for $*$ to $\frac{a*((a+1)*(a+2))}{1*(2*3)}$" in elementary algebra. Alternately, the rule could have been applied to the denominator of the original term, yielding $\frac{a*((a+1)*(a+2))}{(1*2)*3}$.

=== Termination ===
Termination issues of rewrite systems in general are handled in Abstract rewriting system#Termination and convergence. For term rewriting systems in particular, the following additional subtleties are to be considered.

Termination even of a system consisting of one rule with a linear left-hand side is undecidable. Termination is also undecidable for systems using only unary function symbols; however, it is decidable for finite ground systems.

The following term rewrite system is normalizing, (Note: i.e. for each term, some normal form exists, e.g. h(c,c) has the normal forms b and g(b), since h(c,c) → f(h(c,c),h(c,c)) → f(h(c,c),f(h(c,c),h(c,c))) → f(h(c,c),g(h(c,c))) → b, and h(c,c) → f(h(c,c),h(c,c)) → g(h(c,c)) → ... → g(b); neither b nor g(b) can be rewritten any further, therefore the system is not confluent) but not terminating, (Note: i.e., there are infinite derivations, e.g. h(c,c) → f(h(c,c),h(c,c)) → f(f(h(c,c),h(c,c)) ,h(c,c)) → f(f(f(h(c,c),h(c,c)),h(c,c)) ,h(c,c)) → ...) and not confluent:
$$\begin{align}
f(x,x)    & \rightarrow g(x) , \\
f(x,g(x)) & \rightarrow b , \\
h(c,x)    & \rightarrow f(h(x,c),h(x,x)) . \\
\end{align}$$

The following two examples of terminating term rewrite systems are due to Toyama:

$$f(0,1,x) \rightarrow f(x,x,x)$$

and

$$g(x,y) \rightarrow x,$$
$$g(x,y) \rightarrow y.$$

Their union is a non-terminating system, since

$$\begin{align}
& f(g(0,1),g(0,1),g(0,1)) \\
\rightarrow & f(0,g(0,1),g(0,1)) \\
\rightarrow & f(0,1,g(0,1)) \\
\rightarrow & f(g(0,1),g(0,1),g(0,1)) \\
\rightarrow & \cdots
\end{align}$$
This result disproves a conjecture of Dershowitz, who claimed that the union of two terminating term rewrite systems $R_1$ and $R_2$ is again terminating if all left-hand sides of $R_1$ and right-hand sides of $R_2$ are linear, and there are no "overlaps" between left-hand sides of $R_1$ and right-hand sides of $R_2$. All these properties are satisfied by Toyama's examples.

See Rewrite order and Path ordering (term rewriting) for ordering relations used in termination proofs for term rewriting systems.

=== Higher-order rewriting systems ===
Higher-order rewriting systems are a generalization of first-order term rewriting systems to lambda terms, allowing higher order functions and bound variables. Various results about first-order TRSs can be reformulated for HRSs as well.

=== Graph rewriting systems ===
Graph rewrite systems are another generalization of term rewrite systems, operating on graphs instead of (ground-) terms / their corresponding tree representation.

== Trace rewriting systems ==
Trace theory provides a means for discussing multiprocessing in more formal terms, such as via the trace monoid and the history monoid. Rewriting can be performed in trace systems as well.

== See also ==
- Critical pair (logic)
- Compiler
- Knuth–Bendix completion algorithm
- L-systems specify rewriting that is done in parallel.
- Referential transparency in computer science
- Regulated rewriting
- Interaction nets

== Sources ==
- Avenhaus, Jürgen; Madlener, Klaus (1990). "Term rewriting and equational reasoning". In Banerji, Ranan B. (ed.). Formal Techniques in Artificial Intelligence: A Sourcebook. Elsevier. pp. 1–43.
- Bezem, Marc; Klop, Jan Willem; de Vrijer, Roel (2003). Term Rewriting Systems. Cambridge University Press. ISBN 0-521-39115-6. Published under the collective name "Terese" ("TeReSe"). This is the most recent comprehensive monograph. It uses however a fair deal of non-yet-standard notations and definitions. For instance, the Church–Rosser property is defined to be identical with confluence.
- Book, Ronald V.; Otto, Friedrich (1993). String-Rewriting Systems. Springer.
- Clavel, M.; Durán, F.; Eker, S.; Lincoln, P.; Martí-Oliet, N.; Meseguer, J.; Quesada, J.F. (2002). "Maude: Specification and programming in rewriting logic". Theoretical Computer Science. 285 (2): 187–243. doi:10.1016/S0304-3975(01)00359-0. hdl:11441/87265.
- Dauchet, Max (1989). "Simulation of Turing Machines by a Left-Linear Rewrite Rule". Proc. 3rd Int. Conf. on Rewriting Techniques and Applications. LNCS. Vol. 355. Springer. pp. 109–120.
- Dauchet, Max (September 1992). "Simulation of Turing machines by a regular rewrite rule". Theoretical Computer Science. 103 (2): 409–420. doi:10.1016/0304-3975(92)90022-8.
- Davis, Martin; Sigal, Ron; Weyuker, Elaine J. (1994). Computability, Complexity, and Languages: Fundamentals of Theoretical Computer Science (2nd ed.). Academic Press. ISBN 0-12-206382-1.
- Dershowitz, N. (1985). "Termination" (PDF). In Jean-Pierre Jouannaud (ed.). Proc. RTA. LNCS. Vol. 220. Springer. pp. 180–224. Archived (PDF) from the original on 12 November 2013.
- Dershowitz, Nachum; Jouannaud, Jean-Pierre (1990). "Rewrite Systems". In van Leeuwen, Jan (ed.). Handbook of Theoretical Computer Science. Vol. B: Formal Models and Semantics. Elsevier and MIT Press. pp. 243–320. ISBN 0-444-88074-7. The preprint of this chapter is freely available from the authors, but it is missing the figures.
- Freidin, Robert (1992). Foundations of Generative Syntax. MIT Press. ISBN 978-0-262-06144-5.
- Frühwirth, Thom (1998). "Theory and practice of constraint handling rules". The Journal of Logic Programming. 37 (1–3): 95–138. doi:10.1016/S0743-1066(98)10005-5.
- Glivenko, Valery (1929). "Sur quelques points de la logique de M. Brouwer". Bulletins de la Classe des Sciences, Académie Royale de Belgique. 5e série (in French). 15: 183–188.
- Goguen, Joseph (1990). Proving and Rewriting. International Conference on Algebraic and Logic Programming. Nancy, France. pp. 1–24.
- Gräf, Albert (2009). "Signal Processing in the Pure Programming Language". Linux Audio Conference.
- Gramlich, Bernhard (June 1993). "Relating Innermost, Weak, Uniform, and Modular Termination of Term Rewriting Systems". In Voronkov, Andrei (ed.). Proc. International Conference on Logic Programming and Automated Reasoning (LPAR). LNAI. Vol. 624. Springer. pp. 285–296. Archived from the original on 4 March 2016.
- Hsiang, Jieh; Kirchner, Hélène; Lescanne, Pierre; Rusinowitch, Michaël (1992). "The term rewriting approach to automated theorem proving". The Journal of Logic Programming. 14 (1–2): 71–99. doi:10.1016/0743-1066(92)90047-7.
- Huet, Gerard; Lankford, D. S. (March 1978). On the Uniform Halting Problem for Term Rewriting Systems (PDF) (Technical report). IRIA. p. 8. 283.
- Klop, Jan Willem (1992). "Term Rewriting Systems" ( (PDF)). In Abramsky, Samson; Gabbay, Dov M.; Maibaum, Tom (eds.). Handbook of Logic in Computer Science. Vol. 2: Background: Computational Structures. Oxford University Press. pp. 1–116. Archived from the original on 15 August 2021.
- Marriott, Kim; Stuckey, Peter J. (1998). Programming with Constraints: An Introduction. MIT Press. ISBN 978-0-262-13341-8.
- Mints, Grigori (1990). "Gentzen-type systems and resolution rules. Part I: Propositional logic". In Martin-Löf, Per; Mints, Grigori (eds.). COLOG-88. Lecture Notes in Computer Science. Vol. 417. Springer. pp. 198–231.
- Nipkow, Tobias; Prehofer, Christian (1998). "Higher-Order Rewriting and Equational Reasoning". In Bibel, W.; Schmitt, P. (eds.). Automated Deduction - A Basis for Applications. Volume I: Foundations. Kluwer. pp. 399–430. Archived from the original on 16 August 2021.
- Riepe, Michael (18 November 2009). "Pure – eine einfache funktionale Sprache". Archived from the original on 19 March 2011.
- Sculthorpe, Neil; Frisby, Nicolas; Gill, Andy (2014). "The Kansas University rewrite engine" (PDF). Journal of Functional Programming. 24 (4): 434–473. doi:10.1017/S0956796814000185. ISSN 0956-7968. S2CID 16807490. Archived (PDF) from the original on 22 September 2017.
- Toyama, Yoshihito (1987). "Counterexamples to Termination for the Direct Sum of Term Rewriting Systems" (PDF). Inf. Process. Lett. 25 (3): 141–143. doi:10.1016/0020-0190(87)90122-0. hdl:2433/99946. Archived (PDF) from the original on 13 November 2019.
- Wolfram, D. A. (1993). The Clausal Theory of Types. Cambridge University Press. doi:10.1017/CBO9780511569906. ISBN 9780521395380. S2CID 42331173.
