= Rewrite order =

Rewriting s to t by a rule l::=r. If l and r are related by a rewrite relation, so are s and t. A simplification ordering always relates l and s, and similarly r and t.

In theoretical computer science, in particular in automated reasoning about formal equations, reduction orderings are used to prevent endless loops. Rewrite orders, and, in turn, rewrite relations, are generalizations of this concept that have turned out to be useful in theoretical investigations.

== Motivation ==
Intuitively, a reduction order R relates two terms s and t if t is properly "simpler" than s in some sense.

For example, simplification of terms may be a part of a computer algebra program, and may be using the rule set { x+0 → x , 0+x → x , x*0 → 0, 0*x → 0, x*1 → x , 1*x → x }. In order to prove impossibility of endless loops when simplifying a term using these rules, the reduction order defined by "sRt if term t is properly shorter than term s" can be used; applying any rule from the set will always properly shorten the term.

In contrast, to establish termination of "distributing-out" using the rule x*(y+z) → x*y+x*z, a more elaborate reduction order will be needed, since this rule may blow up the term size due to duplication of x. The theory of rewrite orders aims at helping to provide an appropriate order in such cases.

== Formal definitions ==
Formally, a binary relation (→) on the set of terms is called a rewrite relation if it is closed under contextual embedding and under instantiation; formally: if l→r implies u[lσ]_{p}→u[rσ]_{p} for all terms l, r, u, each path p of u, and each substitution σ. If (→) is also irreflexive and transitive, then it is called a rewrite ordering, or rewrite preorder. If the latter (→) is moreover well-founded, it is called a reduction ordering, or a reduction preorder. Given a binary relation R, its rewrite closure is the smallest rewrite relation containing R. A transitive and reflexive rewrite relation that contains the subterm ordering is called a simplification ordering.

Overview of rewrite relations (Note: Parenthesized entries indicate inferred properties which are not part of the definition. For example, an irreflexive relation cannot be reflexive (on a nonempty domain set).)
	rewrite relation	rewrite order	reduction order	simplification order
closed under context x R y implies u[x]_{p} R u[y]_{p}	Yes	Yes	Yes	Yes
closed under instantiation x R y implies xσ R yσ	Yes	Yes	Yes	Yes
contains subterm relation y subterm of x implies x R y				Yes
reflexive always x R x		(No)	(No)	Yes
irreflexive never x R x		Yes	Yes	(No)
transitive x R y and y R z implies x R z		Yes	Yes	Yes
well-founded no infinite chain x_{1} R x_{2} R x_{3} R ... (Note: except all x_{i} are equal for all i beyond some n, for a reflexive relation)			Yes	(Yes)

== Properties ==
- The converse, the symmetric closure, the reflexive closure, and the transitive closure of a rewrite relation is again a rewrite relation, as are the union and the intersection of two rewrite relations.
- The converse of a rewrite order is again a rewrite order.
- While rewrite orders exist that are total on the set of ground terms ("ground-total" for short), no rewrite order can be total on the set of all terms. (Note: Since x<y implies y<x, since the latter is an instance of the former, for variables x, y.)
- A term rewriting system {l_{1}::=r_{1},...,l_{n}::=r_{n}, ...} is terminating if its rules are a subset of a reduction ordering. (Note: i.e. if l_{i} > r_{i} for all i, where (>) is a reduction ordering; the system need not have finitely many rules)
- Conversely, for every terminating term rewriting system, the transitive closure of (::=) is a reduction ordering, which need not be extendable to a ground-total one, however. For example, the ground term rewriting system { f(a)::=f(b), g(b)::=g(a) } is terminating, but can be shown so using a reduction ordering only if the constants a and b are incomparable. (Note: Since e.g. a>b implied g(a)>g(b), meaning the second rewrite rule was not decreasing.)
- A ground-total and well-founded rewrite ordering (Note: i.e. a ground-total reduction ordering) necessarily contains the proper subterm relation on ground terms. (Note: Else, t|_{p} > t for some term t and position p, implying an infinite descending chain t > t[t]_{p} > t[t[t]_{p}]_{p} > ...)
- Conversely, a rewrite ordering that contains the subterm relation (Note: i.e. a simplification ordering) is necessarily well-founded, when the set of function symbols is finite. (Note: The proof of this property is based on Higman's lemma, or, more generally, Kruskal's tree theorem.)
- A finite term rewriting system {l_{1}::=r_{1},...,l_{n}::=r_{n}, ...} is terminating if its rules are subset of the strict part of a simplification ordering.
