= Encompassment ordering =

Term ordering in abstract rewriting

Triangle diagram of two terms s ≤ t related by the encompassment preorder.

In theoretical computer science, in particular in automated theorem proving and term rewriting, the containment, or encompassment, preorder (≤) on the set of terms, is defined by

s ≤ t if a subterm of t is a substitution instance of s.

It is used e.g. in the Knuth–Bendix completion algorithm.

== Properties ==
- Encompassment is a preorder, i.e. reflexive and transitive, but not anti-symmetric, (Note: since both f(x) ≤ f(y) and f(y) ≤ f(x) for variable symbols x, y and a function symbol f) nor total (Note: since neither a ≤ b nor b ≤ a for distinct constant symbols a, b)
- The corresponding equivalence relation, defined by s ~ t if s ≤ t ≤ s, is equality modulo renaming.
- s ≤ t whenever s is a subterm of t.
- s ≤ t whenever t is a substitution instance of s.
- The union of any well-founded rewrite order R (Note: i.e. irreflexive, transitive, and well-founded binary relation R such that sRt implies u[sσ]_{p} R u[tσ]_{p} for all terms s, t, u, each path p of u, and each substitution σ) with (<) is well-founded, where (<) denotes the irreflexive kernel of (≤). In particular, (<) itself is well-founded.
