= Jean-Pierre Jouannaud =

French computer scientist (born 1947)

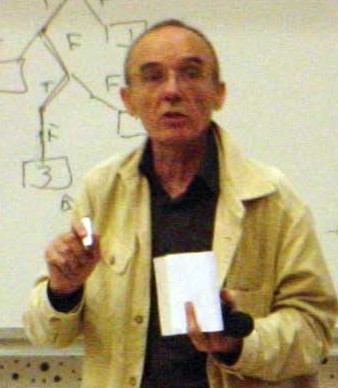
- May 2008
- Born: 21 May 1947 (age 79); Aix-les-Bains
- Awards: CNRS Silver Medal 1986, Prix Michel Montpetit 2000
- Scientific career
- Theses: Filtres digitaux autoadaptifs: algorithmes de calcul et simulation (1972); Sur l'inférence et la synthèse automatiques de fonctions LISP à partir d'exemples (1977)
- Website: www.lix.polytechnique.fr/Labo/Jean-Pierre.Jouannaud

Jean-Pierre Jouannaud is a French computer scientist, known for his work in the area of term rewriting.

He was born on 21 May 1947 in Aix-les-Bains (France). From 1967 to 1969 he attended the Ecole Polytechnique (Paris). In 1970, 1972, and 1977, he wrote his Master thesis (DEA), PhD thesis (Thèse de 3ème cycle), and Habilitation thesis (Thèse d'état), respectively, at the Université de Paris VI. In 1979, he became an associate professor at the Nancy University; 1985 he changed to the Université de Paris-Sud, where he became a full professor in 1986.

He was member of the steering committee of several international computer science conferences: International Conference on Rewriting Techniques and Applications (RTA) 1989–1994, IEEE Symposium on Logic in Computer Science (LICS) 1993–1997, Conference for Computer Science Logic (CSL) 1993–1997, International Conference on Principles and Practice of Constraint Programming (CP) since 1994, and Federated Logic Conference (FLoC) 1995–1999. Since 1997, he is member of the EATCS council.

== Selected publications ==
- Jean Pierre Jouannaud; Pierre Lescanne (Sep 1982). "On Multiset Orderings" (PDF). Inf. Process. Lett. 15 (2): 57–63. doi:10.1016/0020-0190(82)90107-7.
- J.P. Jouannaud; P. Lescanne; F. Reinig (1982). "Recursive Decomposition Ordering". Proc. IFIP TC2 Working Conf. on Formal Description of Programming Concepts, Vol.II (PDF). North-Holland. pp. 331–348.
- Jouannaud, Jean-Pierre, ed. (1985). Rewriting Techniques and Applications, 1st Int. Conf., RTA-85. LNCS. Vol. 202. Springer.
- A. Boudet; J.P. Jouannaud; M. Schmidt-Schauß (1989). "Unification in Boolean Rings and Abelian Groups". Journal of Symbolic Computation. 8 (5): 449–477. doi:10.1016/s0747-7171(89)80054-9.
- N. Dershowitz; J.-P. Jouannaud (1990). "Rewrite Systems". In Jan van Leeuwen (ed.). Formal Models and Semantics. Handbook of Theoretical Computer Science. Vol. B. Elsevier. pp. 243–320.
- N. Dershowitz; J.-P. Jouannaud (1990). "Notations for Rewriting". Bulletin of the EATCS. 43: 162–174.
- N. Dershowitz and J.-P. Jouannaud and J.W. Klop (1991). "Open Problems in Rewriting". In Book, Ronald V. (ed.). Rewriting Techniques and Applications, 4th Int. Conf., RTA-91. LNCS. Vol. 488. Springer. pp. 445–456.
- Hubert Comon; M. Haberstrau; J.-P. Jouannaud (1992). "Decidable Problems in Shallow Equational Theories (Extended Abstract)". Seventh Annual IEEE Symposium on Logic in Computer Science. pp. 255–265.
- N. Dershowitz; J.-P. Jouannaud; J.W. Klop (1993). "More Problems in Rewriting". In Kirchner, Claude (ed.). Rewriting Techniques and Applications, 5th Int. Conf., RTA-93. LNCS. Vol. 690. Springer. pp. 468–487.
- Jouannaud, J.-P.; Rubio, A. (1996). "A Recursive Path Ordering for Higher-Order Terms in eta-Long beta-Normal Form". In Harald Ganzinger (ed.). Rewriting Techniques and Applications, 7th Int. Conf., RTA-96. LNCS. Vol. 1103. Springer. pp. 108–122.
- Jouannaud, J.-P. (2005). "Twenty Years Later". In Giesl, J. (ed.). Term Rewriting and Applications, 16th Int. Conf., RTA-05. LNCS. Vol. 3467. Springer. pp. 368–375. ISBN 978-3-540-25596-3.
- Jouannaud, J.-P. (2006). "Modular Church-Rosser Modulo". In Frank Pfenning (ed.). Term Rewriting and Applications, 17th Int. Conf., RTA-06. LNCS. Vol. 4098. Springer. pp. 96–107.
- Jouannaud, J.-P.; Rubio, A. (2006). "Higher-Order Orderings for Normal Rewriting". In Frank Pfenning (ed.). Term Rewriting and Applications, 17th Int. Conf., RTA-06. LNCS. Vol. 4098. Springer. pp. 387–399.
