= Closure (mathematics) =

Operation on the subsets of a set

In mathematics, a subset of a larger set is closed under a given operation on the larger set if performing that operation on members of the subset always produces a member of that subset. For example, the natural numbers are closed under addition, but not under subtraction: 1 − 2 is not a natural number, although both 1 and 2 are.

Similarly, a subset is said to be closed under a collection of operations if it is closed under each of the operations individually.

The closure of a subset is the result of a closure operator applied to the subset. The closure of a subset under some operations is the smallest superset that is closed under these operations. It is often called the span (for example linear span) or the generated set.

== Definitions ==
Let S be a set equipped with one or several methods for producing elements of S from other elements of S. (Note: Operations and (partial) multivariate function are examples of such methods. If S is a topological space, the limit of a sequence of elements of S is an example, where there are an infinity of input elements and the result is not always defined. If S is a field the roots in S of a polynomial with coefficients in S is another example where the result may be not unique.) A subset X of S is said to be closed under these methods if an input of purely elements of X always results in an element still in X. Sometimes, one may also say that X has the closure property.

The main property of closed sets, which results immediately from the definition, is that every intersection of closed sets is a closed set. It follows that for every subset Y of S, there is a smallest closed subset X of S such that $Y\subseteq X$ (it is the intersection of all closed subsets that contain Y). Depending on the context, X is called the closure of Y or the set generated or spanned by Y.

The concepts of closed sets and closure are often extended to any property of subsets that are stable under intersection; that is, every intersection of subsets that have the property has also the property. For example, in $\Complex^n,$ a Zariski-closed set, also known as an algebraic set, is the set of the common zeros of a family of polynomials, and the Zariski closure of a set V of points is the smallest algebraic set that contains V.

=== In algebraic structures ===
An algebraic structure is a set equipped with operations that satisfy some axioms. These axioms may be identities. Some axioms may contain existential quantifiers $\exists;$ in this case it is worth to add some auxiliary operations in order that all axioms become identities or purely universally quantified formulas. See Algebraic structure for details. A set with a single binary operation that is closed is called a magma.

In this context, given an algebraic structure S, a substructure of S is a subset that is closed under all operations of S, including the auxiliary operations that are needed for avoiding existential quantifiers. A substructure is an algebraic structure of the same type as S. It follows that, in a specific example, when closeness is proved, there is no need to check the axioms for proving that a substructure is a structure of the same type.

Given a subset X of an algebraic structure S, the closure of X is the smallest substructure of S that is closed under all operations of S. In the context of algebraic structures, this closure is generally called the substructure generated or spanned by X, and one says that X is a generating set of the substructure.

For example, a group is a set with an associative operation, often called multiplication, with an identity element, such that every element has an inverse element. Here, the auxiliary operations are the nullary operation that results in the identity element and the unary operation of inversion. A subset of a group that is closed under multiplication and inversion is also closed under the nullary operation (that is, it contains the identity) if and only if it is non-empty. So, a non-empty subset of a group that is closed under multiplication and inversion is a group that is called a subgroup. The subgroup generated by a single element, that is, the closure of this element, is called a cyclic group.

In linear algebra, the closure of a non-empty subset of a vector space (under vector-space operations, that is, addition and scalar multiplication) is the linear span of this subset. It is a vector space by the preceding general result, and it can be proved easily that is the set of linear combinations of elements of the subset.

Similar examples can be given for almost every algebraic structures, with, sometimes some specific terminology. For example, in a commutative ring, the closure of a single element under ideal operations is called a principal ideal.

== Binary relations ==
A binary relation $R$ on a set $A$ is a subset of $A\times A$, which is the set of all ordered pairs on $A$. The infix notation $xRy$ is commonly used for $(x,y)\in R$. We can define different kinds of closures of $R$ on $A$ by the properties and operations of it. For examples: (Note: The description style for the closures in these examples is based on that found on the wiki page Transitive closure, i.e. "the transitive closure R^{+} of a homogeneous binary relation R on a set X is the smallest relation on X that contains R and is transitive.")

Reflexivity
As every intersection of reflexive relations is reflexive, we define the reflexive closure of $R$ on $A$ as the smallest reflexive relation on $A$ that contains $R$.
Symmetry
As we can define a unary operation on $A\times A$ that maps $(x,y)$ to $(y,x)$, we define the symmetric closure of $R$ on $A$ as the smallest relation on $A$ that contains $R$ and is closed under this unary operation.
Transitivity
As we can define a partial binary operation on $A\times A$ that maps $(x,y)$ and $(y,z)$ to $(x,z)$, we define the transitive closure of $R$ on $A$ as the smallest relation on $A$ that contains $R$ and is closed under this partial binary operation.

A preorder is a relation that is reflective and transitive. It follows that the reflexive transitive closure of a relation is the smallest preorder containing it. Similarly, the reflexive transitive symmetric closure or equivalence closure of a relation is the smallest equivalence relation that contains it.

== Other examples ==
- In matroid theory, the closure of X is the largest superset of X that has the same rank as X.
- The transitive closure of a set.
- The algebraic closure of a field.
- The integral closure of an integral domain in a field that contains it.
- The radical of an ideal in a commutative ring.
- In geometry, the convex hull of a set S of points is the smallest convex set of which S is a subset.
- In formal languages, the Kleene closure of a language can be described as the set of strings that can be made by concatenating zero or more strings from that language.
- In group theory, the conjugate closure or normal closure of a set of group elements is the smallest normal subgroup containing the set.
- In mathematical analysis and in probability theory, the closure of a collection of subsets of X under countably many set operations is called the σ-algebra generated by the collection.
- In applied mathematics and physics, "closure" of a system of equations usually means introducing enough relations to eliminate dependence on unspecified quantities. For example, in the statistical mechanics of fluids, a closure relation specifies the form of an otherwise unknown correlation function between interacting particles.

== Closure operator ==
In the preceding sections, closures are considered for subsets of a given set. The subsets of a set form a partially ordered set (poset) for inclusion. Closure operators allow generalizing the concept of closure to any partially ordered set.

Given a poset S whose partial order is denoted with ≤, a closure operator on S is a function $C:S\to S$ that is

- increasing ($x\le C(x)$ for all $x\in S$),
- idempotent ($C(C(x))=C(x)$), and
- monotonic ($x\le y \implies C(x)\le C(y)$).

Equivalently, a function from S to S is a closure operator if $x \le C(y) \iff C(x) \le C(y)$ for all $x,y\in S.$

An element of S is closed if it is its own closure, that is, if $x=C(x).$ By idempotency, an element is closed if and only if it is the closure of some element of S.

An example is the topological closure operator; in Kuratowski's characterization, axioms K2, K3, K4' correspond to the above defining properties. An example not operating on subsets is the ceiling function, which maps every real number x to the smallest integer that is not smaller than x.

=== Closure operator vs. closed sets ===
A closure on the subsets of a given set may be defined either by a closure operator or by a set of closed sets that is stable under intersection and includes the given set. These two definitions are equivalent.

Indeed, the defining properties of a closure operator C implies that an intersection of closed sets is closed: if $X = \bigcap X_i$ is an intersection of closed sets, then $C(X)$ must contain X and be contained in every $X_i.$ This implies $C(X) = X$ by definition of the intersection.

Conversely, if closed sets are given and every intersection of closed sets is closed, then one can define a closure operator C such that $C(X)$ is the intersection of the closed sets containing X.

This equivalence remains true for partially ordered sets with the greatest-lower-bound property, if one replace "closed sets" by "closed elements" and "intersection" by "greatest lower bound".
