= Jan Willem Klop =

Dutch computer scientist (1945–2025)

- Born: 19 December 1945; Gorinchem, Netherlands
- Died: 28 September 2025 (aged 79)
- Spouse: Marianne Leicher
- Children: 1
- Awards: University of East Anglia hon. doctorate (2002); IFIP WG 1.6 hon. member (2011)
- Scientific career
- Thesis: Combinatory Reduction Systems (1980)
- Doctoral advisor: Dirk van Dalen; Henk Barendregt
- Doctoral students: Massimo Marchiori

Jan Willem Klop (19 December 1945 – 28 September 2025) was a Dutch mathematician who was professor of applied logic at Vrije Universiteit in Amsterdam. He held a Ph.D. in mathematical logic from Utrecht University. Klop is known for his work on the algebra of communicating processes, term re-writing and infinitary lambda calculus, as co-author of TeReSe and for his fixed point combinator

Y_{k} = (L L L L L L L L L L L L L L L L L L L L L L L L L L)

where

L = λabcdefghijklmnopqstuvwxyzr. (r (t h i s i s a f i x e d p o i n t c o m b i n a t o r))

Klop became a member of the Royal Netherlands Academy of Arts and Sciences in 2003. He died on 28 September 2025, at the age of 79.

== Selected publications ==
- Jan Willem Klop (1980). Combinatory Reduction Systems (PDF) (Ph.D. thesis). Utrecht University.
- J.C.M. Baeten; Jan Bergstra; Jan Willem Klop (1987). "Term Rewriting Systems with Priorities". In Lescanne, Pierre (ed.). Rewriting Techniques and Applications, 2nd Int. Conf., RTA-87. LNCS. Vol. 256. Springer. pp. 83–94. — preceding technical report FVI 86-03
- Y. Toyama; Jan Willem Klop; Henk Barendregt (1989). "Termination for the Direct Sum of left-Linear Term Rewriting Systems -Preliminary Draft-". In Nachum Dershowitz (ed.). Rewriting Techniques and Applications, 3rd Int. Conf., RTA-89. LNCS. Vol. 355. Springer. pp. 477–491. — preceding technical report IEICE COMP 88-90
- N. Dershowitz; Jean-Pierre Jouannaud; Jan Willem Klop (1991). "Open Problems in Rewriting". In Ronald V. Book (ed.). Rewriting Techniques and Applications, 4th Int. Conf., RTA-91 (PDF). LNCS. Vol. 488. Springer. pp. 445–456.
- J.R. Kennaway; J.W. Klop; M.R. Sleep; F.-J. de Vries (1991). "Transfinite Reductions in Orthogonal Term Rewriting Systems (Extended Abstract)". In Book, Ronald V. (ed.). Rewriting Techniques and Applications, 4th Int. Conf., RTA-91 (PDF). LNCS. Vol. 488. Springer. pp. 1–12. Archived from the original (PDF) on 4 February 2015.
- N. Dershowitz; J.-P. Jouannaud; J.W. Klop (1993). "More Problems in Rewriting". In Kirchner, Claude (ed.). Rewriting Techniques and Applications, 5th Int. Conf., RTA-93 (PDF). LNCS. Vol. 690. Springer. pp. 468–487.
- R. Kennaway; J.W. Klop; M.R. Sleep; F.-J. de Vries (1995). "Infinitary Lambda Calculi and Böhm Models". In Hsiang, Jieh (ed.). 6th Int. Conf. on Rewriting Techniques and Applications (RTA). LNCS. Vol. 914. Springer. pp. 257–270.
- Jan Willem Klop (1998). "Origin Tracking in Term Rewriting (invited lecture)". In Tobias Nipkow (ed.). Rewriting Techniques and Applications, 9th Int. Conf., RTA-98. LNCS. Vol. 1379. Springer. p. 1.
