= Regulated rewriting =

Regulated rewriting is a specific area of formal languages studying grammatical systems which are able to take some kind of control over the production applied in a derivation step. For this reason, the grammatical systems studied in Regulated Rewriting theory are also called "Grammars with Controlled Derivations". Among such grammars can be noticed:

== Matrix Grammars ==
=== Basic concepts ===
Definition
A Matrix Grammar, $MG$, is a four-tuple $G = (N, T, M, S)$ where
1.- $N$ is an alphabet of non-terminal symbols
2.- $T$ is an alphabet of terminal symbols disjoint with $N$
3.- $M = {m_1, m_2,..., m_n}$ is a finite set of matrices, which are non-empty sequences $m_{i} = [p_{i_1},...,p_{i_{k(i)}}]$, with $k(i)\geq 1$, and $1 \leq i \leq n$, where each $p_{i_{j}} 1\leq j\leq k(i)$, is an ordered pair $p_{i_{j}} = (L, R)$ being $L \in (N \cup T)^*N(N\cup T)^*, R \in (N\cup T)^*$ these pairs are called "productions", and are denoted $L\rightarrow R$. In these conditions the matrices can be written down as $m_i = [L_{i_{1}}\rightarrow R_{i_{1}},...,L_{i_{k(i)}}\rightarrow R_{i_{k(i)}}]$
4.- S is the start symbol

Definition
Let $MG = (N, T, M, S)$ be a matrix grammar and let $P$ the collection of all productions on matrices of $MG$. We said that $MG$ is of type $i$ according to Chomsky's hierarchy with $i=0,1,2,3$, or "increasing length" or "linear" or "without $\lambda$-productions" if and only if the grammar $G=(N, T, P, S)$ has the corresponding property.

=== The classic example ===
Note: taken from Abraham 1965, with change of nonterminals names

The context-sensitive language $L(G) = \{ a^nb^nc^n : n\geq 1\}$ is generated by the $CFMG$ $G =(N, T, M, S)$ where $N = \{S, A, B, C\}$ is the non-terminal set, $T = \{a, b, c\}$ is the terminal set, and the set of matrices is defined as $M :$ $\left[S\rightarrow abc\right]$, $\left[S\rightarrow aAbBcC\right]$, $\left[A\rightarrow aA,B\rightarrow bB,C\rightarrow cC\right]$, $\left[A\rightarrow a,B\rightarrow b,C\rightarrow c\right]$.

== Time Variant Grammars ==
Basic concepts
Definition
A Time Variant Grammar is a pair $(G, v)$ where $G = (N, T, P, S)$ is a grammar and $v: \mathbb{N}\rightarrow 2^{P}$ is a function from the set of natural numbers to the class of subsets of the set of productions.

== Programmed Grammars ==
Basic concepts

=== Definition ===
A Programmed Grammar is a pair $(G, s)$ where $G = (N, T, P, S)$ is a grammar and $s, f: P\rightarrow 2^{P}$ are the success and fail functions from the set of productions to the class of subsets of the set of productions.

== Grammars with regular control language ==
=== Basic concepts ===
Definition
A Grammar With Regular Control Language, $GWRCL$, is a pair $(G, e)$ where $G = (N, T, P, S)$ is a grammar and $e$ is a regular expression over the alphabet of the set of productions.

=== A naive example ===
Consider the CFG $G = (N, T, P, S)$ where $N = \{S, A, B, C\}$ is the non-terminal set, $T = \{a, b, c\}$ is the terminal set, and the productions set is defined as $P = \{p_0, p_1, p_2, p_3, p_4, p_5, p_6\}$ being $p_0 = S\rightarrow ABC$ $p_1 = A\rightarrow aA$, $p_2 = B\rightarrow bB$, $p_3 = C\rightarrow cC$ $p_4 = A\rightarrow a$, $p_5 = B\rightarrow b$, and $p_6 = C\rightarrow c$. Clearly, $L(G) = \{ a^*b^*c^*\}$. Now, considering the productions set $P$ as an alphabet (since it is a finite set), define the regular expression over $P$: $e=p_0(p_1p_2p_3)^*(p_4p_5p_6)$.

Combining the CFG grammar $G$ and the regular expression $e$, we obtain the CFGWRCL $(G,e) =(G,p_0(p_1p_2p_3)^*(p_4p_5p_6))$ which generates the language $L(G) = \{ a^nb^nc^n : n\geq 1\}$.

Besides there are other grammars with regulated rewriting, the four cited above are good examples of how to extend context-free grammars with some kind of control mechanism to obtain a Turing machine powerful grammatical device.
