= Preorder =

Reflexive and transitive binary relation

Transitive binary relations

	Symmetric	Antisymmetric	Connected	Well-founded	Has joins	Has meets	Reflexive	Irreflexive	Asymmetric
			Total, Semiconnex					Anti- reflexive
Equivalence relation	✓	✗	✗	✗	✗	✗	✓	✗	✗
Preorder (Quasiorder)	✗	✗	✗	✗	✗	✗	✓	✗	✗
Partial order	✗	✓	✗	✗	✗	✗	✓	✗	✗
Total preorder	✗	✗	✓	✗	✗	✗	✓	✗	✗
Total order	✗	✓	✓	✗	✗	✗	✓	✗	✗
Prewellordering	✗	✗	✓	✓	✗	✗	✓	✗	✗
Well-quasi-ordering	✗	✗	✗	✓	✗	✗	✓	✗	✗
Well-ordering	✗	✓	✓	✓	✗	✗	✓	✗	✗
Lattice	✗	✓	✗	✗	✓	✓	✓	✗	✗
Join-semilattice	✗	✓	✗	✗	✓	✗	✓	✗	✗
Meet-semilattice	✗	✓	✗	✗	✗	✓	✓	✗	✗
Strict partial order	✗	✓	✗	✗	✗	✗	✗	✓	✓
Strict weak order	✗	✓	✗	✗	✗	✗	✗	✓	✓
Strict total order	✗	✓	✓	✗	✗	✗	✗	✓	✓
	Symmetric	Antisymmetric	Connected	Well-founded	Has joins	Has meets	Reflexive	Irreflexive	Asymmetric
Definitions, for all $a, b$ and $S\neq\varnothing :$	$$\begin{align}&aRb \\ \Rightarrow{} &bRa\end{align}$$	$$\begin{align}aRb\text{ and }&bRa \\ \Rightarrow a ={} &b\end{align}$$	$$\begin{align}a \neq{} &b \Rightarrow \\ aRb\text{ or }&bRa\end{align}$$	$$\begin{align}\min S \\ \text{exists}\end{align}$$	$$\begin{align}a \vee b \\ \text{exists}\end{align}$$	$$\begin{align}a \wedge b \\ \text{exists}\end{align}$$	$aRa$	$\text{not }aRa$	$$\begin{align}aRb \Rightarrow \\ \text{not }bRa\end{align}$$

✓ indicates that the column's property is always true for the row's term (at the very left), while ✗ indicates that the property is not guaranteed
in general (it might, or might not, hold). For example, that every equivalence relation is symmetric, but not necessarily antisymmetric,
is indicated by ✓ in the "Symmetric" column and ✗ in the "Antisymmetric" column, respectively.

All definitions tacitly require the homogeneous relation $R$ be transitive: for all $a, b, c,$ if $aRb$ and $bRc$ then $aRc.$
A term's definition may require additional properties that are not listed in this table.

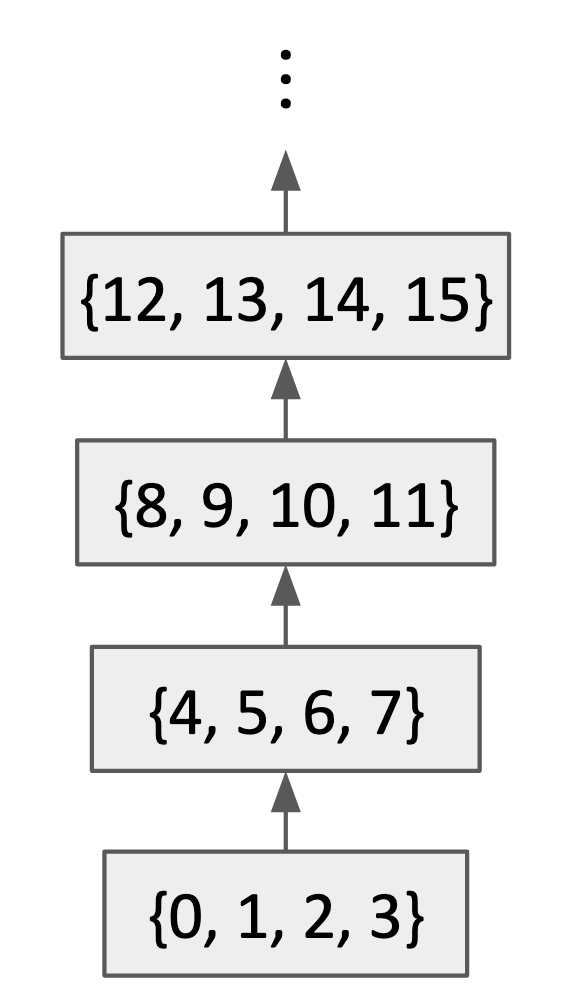
x R y defined by x//4≤y//4 is a preorder on the natural numbers. It corresponds to the equivalence relation x E y defined by x//4=y//4. The set of equivalence classes is partially ordered, and thus can be shown as a Hasse diagram (depicted).

In mathematics, in particular in order theory, a preorder or quasiorder is a binary relation that is reflexive and transitive. The name preorder is meant to suggest that preorders are almost partial orders, but not quite, as they are not necessarily antisymmetric.

A natural example of a preorder is the divides relation "x divides y" between integers. This relation is reflexive as every integer divides itself. It is also transitive. But it is not antisymmetric, because e.g. $1$ divides $-1$ and $-1$ divides $1$, but $-1$ is not equal to $1$. It is to this preorder that "least" refers in the phrase "least common multiple" (in contrast, using the natural order on integers, e.g. $4$ and $6$ have the common multiples $24$, $12$, $0$, $-12$, $-24$, ..., but no least one).

Preorders are closely related to equivalence relations and (non-strict) partial orders. Both of these are special cases of a preorder: an antisymmetric preorder is a partial order, and a symmetric preorder is an equivalence relation. Moreover, a preorder on a set $X$ can equivalently be defined as an equivalence relation on $X$, together with a partial order on the set of equivalence class, cf. picture. Like partial orders and equivalence relations, preorders (on a nonempty set) are never asymmetric.

A preorder can be visualized as a directed graph, with elements of the set corresponding to vertices, and the order relation between pairs of elements corresponding to the directed edges between vertices. The converse is not true: most directed graphs are neither reflexive nor transitive. A preorder that is antisymmetric no longer has cycles; it is a partial order, and corresponds to a directed acyclic graph. A preorder that is symmetric is an equivalence relation; it can be thought of as having lost the direction markers on the edges of the graph. In general, a preorder's corresponding directed graph may have many disconnected components.

A preorder is often denoted $\,\lesssim\,$ or $\,\leq\,$.

== Definition ==
A binary relation $\,\lesssim\,$ on a set $X$ is called a preorder or quasiorder if it is reflexive and transitive; that is, if it satisfies:

1. Reflexivity: $a \lesssim a$ for all $a \in X,$ and
2. Transitivity: if $a \lesssim b \text{ and } b \lesssim c \text{ then } a \lesssim c$ for all $a, b, c \in X.$

A set that is equipped with a preorder is called a preordered set (or proset).

== Preorders as partial orders on partitions ==
Given a preorder $\,\lesssim\,$ on $X$ one may define an equivalence relation $\,\sim\,$ on $X$ by
$$a \sim b \quad \text{ if } \quad a \lesssim b \; \text{ and } \; b \lesssim a.$$
The resulting relation $\,\sim\,$ is reflexive since the preorder $\,\lesssim\,$ is reflexive; transitive by applying the transitivity of $\,\lesssim\,$ twice; and symmetric by definition.

Using this relation, it is possible to construct a partial order on the quotient set $X / \sim$ of the equivalence, by defining $[x] \leq [y]$ if $x \lesssim y.$ That this is well-defined, meaning that it does not depend on the particular choice of representatives $x$ and $y$, follows from the definition of $\,\sim\,$.

Conversely, from any partial order on a partition of a set $X,$ it is possible to construct a preorder on $X$ itself. There is a one-to-one correspondence between preorders and pairs (partition, partial order).

Example: Let $X$ be the set of all (valid or invalid) sentences in some subfield of mathematics, like geometry. Define $p \Leftarrow q$ if $p$ is a logical consequence of $q$. Then $\Leftarrow$ is a preorder on $X$: every sentence $p$ can be proven from itself (reflexivity), and if $p$ can be proven from $q$, and $q$ from $r$, then $p$ can also be proven from $r$ (transitivity). The corresponding equivalence relation is usually denoted $p \Leftrightarrow q$, and defined as $p \Leftarrow q$ and $q \Leftarrow p$; in this case $p$ and $q$ are called "logically equivalent". The equivalence class of a sentence $p$ is the set of all sentences $q \in X$ that are logically equivalent to $p$; formally: $[p] = \{ q \mid p \Leftrightarrow q \}$. The preordered set $(X, \Leftarrow)$ is a directed set: given two sentences $p, q \in X$, their logical conjunction $p \wedge q$, pronounced "both $p$ and $q$", is a common upper bound of them, since $p$ is a consequence of $p \wedge q$, and so is $q$. The partially ordered set $\left(X / \Leftrightarrow, \Leftarrow\right)$ is hence also a directed set. See Lindenbaum–Tarski algebra for a related example.

== Relationship to strict partial orders ==
If reflexivity is replaced with irreflexivity (while keeping transitivity) then we get the definition of a strict partial order on $X$. For this reason, the term strict preorder is sometimes used for a strict partial order. That is, this is a binary relation $\,<\,$ on $X$ that satisfies:

1. Irreflexivity or anti-reflexivity: not $a < a$ for all $a \in X;$ that is, $\,a < a$ is false for all $a \in X,$ and
2. Transitivity: if $a < b \text{ and } b < c \text{ then } a < c$ for all $a, b, c \in X.$

=== Strict partial order induced by a preorder ===
Any preorder $\,\lesssim\,$ gives rise to a strict partial order defined by $a < b$ if and only if $a \lesssim b$ and not $b \lesssim a$. Using the equivalence relation $\,\sim\,$ introduced above, $a < b$ if and only if $a \lesssim b \text{ and not } a \sim b;$ and so the following holds
$$a \lesssim b \quad \text{ if and only if } \quad a < b \; \text{ or } \; a \sim b.$$
The relation $\,<\,$ is a strict partial order and every strict partial order can be constructed this way. If the preorder $\,\lesssim\,$ is antisymmetric (and thus a partial order) then the equivalence $\,\sim\,$ is equality (that is, $a \sim b$ if and only if $a = b$) and so in this case, the definition of $\,<\,$ can be restated as:
$$a < b \quad \text{ if and only if } \quad a \lesssim b \; \text{ and } \; a \neq b \quad\quad (\text{assuming } \lesssim \text{ is antisymmetric}).$$
But importantly, this new condition is not used as (nor is it equivalent to) the general definition of the relation $\,<\,$ (that is, $\,<\,$ is not defined as: $a < b$ if and only if $a \lesssim b \text{ and } a \neq b$) because if the preorder $\,\lesssim\,$ is not antisymmetric then the resulting relation $\,<\,$ would not be transitive (consider how equivalent non-equal elements relate). This is the reason for using the symbol "$\lesssim$" instead of the "less than or equal to" symbol "$\leq$", which might cause confusion for a preorder that is not antisymmetric since it might misleadingly suggest that $a \leq b$ implies $a < b \text{ or } a = b.$

=== Preorders induced by a strict partial order ===
Using the construction above, multiple non-strict preorders can produce the same strict preorder $\,<,\,$ so without more information about how $\,<\,$ was constructed (such as knowledge of the equivalence relation $\,\sim\,$ for instance), it might not be possible to reconstruct the original non-strict preorder from $\,<.\,$ Possible (non-strict) preorders that induce the given strict preorder $\,<\,$ include the following:

- Define $a \leq b$ as $a < b \text{ or } a = b$ (that is, take the reflexive closure of the relation). This gives the partial order associated with the strict partial order "$<$" through reflexive closure; in this case the equivalence is equality $\,=,$ so the symbols $\,\lesssim\,$ and $\,\sim\,$ are not needed.
- Define $a \lesssim b$ as "$\text{ not } b < a$" (that is, take the inverse complement of the relation), which corresponds to defining $a \sim b$ as "neither $a < b \text{ nor } b < a$"; these relations $\,\lesssim\,$ and $\,\sim\,$ are in general not transitive; however, if they are then $\,\sim\,$ is an equivalence; in that case "$<$" is a strict weak order. The resulting preorder is connected (formerly called total); that is, a total preorder.

If $a \leq b$ then $a \lesssim b.$ The converse holds (that is, $\,\lesssim\;\; = \;\;\leq\,$) if and only if whenever $a \neq b$ then $a < b$ or $b < a.$

== Examples ==
=== Graph theory ===
- The reachability relationship in any directed graph (possibly containing cycles) gives rise to a preorder, where $x \lesssim y$ in the preorder if and only if there is a path from x to y in the directed graph. Conversely, every preorder is the reachability relationship of a directed graph (for instance, the graph that has an edge from x to y for every pair (x, y) with $x \lesssim y$). However, many different graphs may have the same reachability preorder as each other. In the same way, reachability of directed acyclic graphs, directed graphs with no cycles, gives rise to partially ordered sets (preorders satisfying an additional antisymmetry property).
- The graph-minor relation is also a preorder.

=== Computer science ===
In computer science, one can find examples of the following preorders.

- Asymptotic order causes a preorder over functions $f: \mathbb{N} \to \mathbb{N}$. The corresponding equivalence relation is called asymptotic equivalence.
- Polynomial-time, many-one (mapping) and Turing reductions are preorders on complexity classes.
- Subtyping relations are usually preorders.
- Simulation preorders are preorders (hence the name).
- Reduction relations in abstract rewriting systems.
- The encompassment preorder on the set of terms, defined by $s \lesssim t$ if a subterm of t is a substitution instance of s.
- Theta-subsumption, which is when the literals in a disjunctive first-order formula are contained by another, after applying a substitution to the former.

=== Category theory ===
- A category with at most one morphism from any object x to any other object y is a preorder. Such categories are called thin. Here the objects correspond to the elements of $X,$ and there is one morphism for objects which are related, zero otherwise. In this sense, categories "generalize" preorders by allowing more than one relation between objects: each morphism is a distinct (named) preorder relation.
- Alternately, a preordered set can be understood as an enriched category, enriched over the category $2 = (0 \to 1).$

=== Other ===
Further examples:

- Every finite topological space gives rise to a preorder on its points by defining $x \lesssim y$ if and only if x belongs to every neighborhood of y. Every finite preorder can be formed as the specialization preorder of a topological space in this way. That is, there is a one-to-one correspondence between finite topologies and finite preorders. However, the relation between infinite topological spaces and their specialization preorders is not one-to-one.
- A net is a directed preorder, that is, each pair of elements has an upper bound. The definition of convergence via nets is important in topology, where preorders cannot be replaced by partially ordered sets without losing important features.
- The relation defined by $x \lesssim y$ if $f(x) \lesssim f(y),$ where f is a function into some preorder.
- The relation defined by $x \lesssim y$ if there exists some injection from x to y. Injection may be replaced by surjection, or any type of structure-preserving function, such as ring homomorphism, or permutation.
- The embedding relation for countable total orderings.

Example of a total preorder:

- Preference, according to common models.

== Constructions ==
Every binary relation $R$ on a set $X$ can be extended to a preorder on $X$ by taking the transitive closure and reflexive closure, $R^{+=}.$ The transitive closure indicates path connection in $R : x R^+ y$ if and only if there is an $R$-path from $x$ to $y.$

Left residual preorder induced by a binary relation

Given a binary relation $R,$ the complemented composition $R \backslash R = \overline{R^\textsf{T} \circ \overline{R}}$ forms a preorder called the left residual, where $R^\textsf{T}$ denotes the converse relation of $R,$ and $\overline{R}$ denotes the complement relation of $R,$ while $\circ$ denotes relation composition.

== Related definitions ==
If a preorder is also antisymmetric, that is, $a \lesssim b$ and $b \lesssim a$ implies $a = b,$ then it is a partial order.

On the other hand, if it is symmetric, that is, if $a \lesssim b$ implies $b \lesssim a,$ then it is an equivalence relation.

A preorder is total if $a \lesssim b$ or $b \lesssim a$ for all $a, b \in X.$

A preordered class is a class equipped with a preorder. Every set is a class and so every preordered set is a preordered class.

== Uses ==
Preorders play a pivotal role in several situations:

- Every preorder can be given a topology, the Alexandrov topology; and indeed, every preorder on a set is in one-to-one correspondence with an Alexandrov topology on that set.
- Preorders may be used to define interior algebras.
- Preorders provide the Kripke semantics for certain types of modal logic.
- Preorders are used in forcing in set theory to prove consistency and independence results.

== Number of preorders ==
Number of n-element binary relations of different types
Elements	Any	Transitive	Reflexive	Symmetric	Preorder	Partial order	Total preorder	Total order	Equivalence relation
0	1	1	1	1	1	1	1	1	1
1	2	2	1	2	1	1	1	1	1
2	16	13	4	8	4	3	3	2	2
3	512	171	64	64	29	19	13	6	5
4	65,536	3,994	4,096	1,024	355	219	75	24	15
n	2^{n^{2}}		2^{n(n−1)}	2^{n(n+1)/2}			∑^{n}_{k=0} k!S(n, k)	n!	∑^{n}_{k=0} S(n, k)
OEIS	A002416	A006905	A053763	A006125	A000798	A001035	A000670	A000142	A000110

Note that S(n, k) refers to Stirling numbers of the second kind.

As explained above, there is a 1-to-1 correspondence between preorders and pairs (partition, partial order). Thus the number of preorders is the sum of the number of partial orders on every partition. For example:

- for $n = 3:$
  - 1 partition of 3, giving 1 preorder
  - 3 partitions of 2 + 1, giving $3 \times 3 = 9$ preorders
  - 1 partition of 1 + 1 + 1, giving 19 preorders
  I.e., together, 29 preorders.
- for $n = 4:$
  - 1 partition of 4, giving 1 preorder
  - 7 partitions with two classes (4 of 3 + 1 and 3 of 2 + 2), giving $7 \times 3 = 21$ preorders
  - 6 partitions of 2 + 1 + 1, giving $6 \times 19 = 114$ preorders
  - 1 partition of 1 + 1 + 1 + 1, giving 219 preorders
  I.e., together, 355 preorders.

== Interval ==
For $a \lesssim b,$ the interval $[a, b]$ is the set of points x satisfying $a \lesssim x$ and $x \lesssim b,$ also written $a \lesssim x \lesssim b.$ It contains at least the points a and b. One may choose to extend the definition to all pairs $(a, b)$. The extra intervals are all empty.

Using the corresponding strict relation "$<$", one can also define the interval $(a, b)$ as the set of points x satisfying $a < x$ and $x < b,$ also written $a < x < b.$ An open interval may be empty even if $a < b.$

Also $[a, b)$ and $(a, b]$ can be defined similarly.

== See also ==
- Partial order – preorder that is antisymmetric
- Equivalence relation – preorder that is symmetric
- Total preorder – preorder that is total
- Total order – preorder that is antisymmetric and total
- Directed set
- Category of preordered sets
- Prewellordering
- Well-quasi-ordering
