= Presentation of a monoid =

In algebra, a presentation of a monoid (or a presentation of a semigroup) is a description of a monoid (or a semigroup) in terms of a set Σ of generators and a set of relations on the free monoid Σ^{∗} (or the free semigroup Σ^{+}) generated by Σ. The monoid is then presented as the quotient of the free monoid (or the free semigroup) by these relations. This is an analogue of a group presentation in group theory.

As a mathematical structure, a monoid presentation is identical to a string rewriting system (also known as a semi-Thue system). Every monoid may be presented by a semi-Thue system (possibly over an infinite alphabet).

A presentation should not be confused with a representation.

== Construction ==
The relations are given as a (finite) binary relation R on Σ^{∗}. To form the quotient monoid, these relations are extended to monoid congruences as follows:

First, one takes the symmetric closure R ∪ R^{−1} of R. This is then extended to a symmetric relation E ⊂ Σ^{∗} × Σ^{∗} by defining x ~_{E} y if and only if x = sut and y = svt for some strings u, v, s, t ∈ Σ^{∗} with (u,v) ∈ R ∪ R^{−1}. Finally, one takes the reflexive and transitive closure of E, which then is a monoid congruence.

In the typical situation, the relation R is simply given as a set of equations, so that $R=\{u_1=v_1,\ldots,u_n=v_n\}$. Thus, for example,
$$\langle p,q\,\vert\; pq=1\rangle$$
is the equational presentation for the bicyclic monoid, and
$$\langle a,b \,\vert\; aba=baa, bba=bab\rangle$$
is the plactic monoid of degree 2 (it has infinite order). Elements of this plactic monoid may be written as $a^ib^j(ba)^k$ for integers i, j, k, as the relations show that ba commutes with both a and b.

== Inverse monoids and semigroups ==
Presentations of inverse monoids and semigroups can be defined in a similar way using a pair
$$(X;T)$$
where
$$(X\cup  X^{-1})^*$$
is the free monoid with involution on $X$, and
$$T\subseteq (X\cup  X^{-1})^*\times (X\cup  X^{-1})^*$$
is a binary relation between words. We denote by $T^{\mathrm{e}}$ (respectively $T^\mathrm{c}$) the equivalence relation (respectively, the congruence) generated by T.

We use this pair of objects to define an inverse monoid
$$\mathrm{Inv}^1 \langle X | T\rangle.$$
Let $\rho_X$ be the Wagner congruence on $X$, we define the inverse monoid
$$\mathrm{Inv}^1 \langle X | T\rangle$$
presented by $(X;T)$ as
$$\mathrm{Inv}^1 \langle X | T\rangle=(X\cup  X^{-1})^*/(T\cup\rho_X)^{\mathrm{c}}.$$

In the previous discussion, if we replace everywhere $({X\cup X^{-1}})^*$ with $({X\cup X^{-1}})^+$ we obtain a presentation (for an inverse semigroup) $(X;T)$ and an inverse semigroup $\mathrm{Inv}\langle X | T\rangle$ presented by $(X;T)$.

A trivial but important example is the free inverse monoid (or free inverse semigroup) on $X$, that is usually denoted by $\mathrm{FIM}(X)$ (respectively $\mathrm{FIS}(X)$) and is defined by
$$\mathrm{FIM}(X)=\mathrm{Inv}^1 \langle X | \varnothing\rangle=({X\cup  X^{-1}})^*/\rho_X,$$
or
$$\mathrm{FIS}(X)=\mathrm{Inv} \langle X | \varnothing\rangle=({X\cup  X^{-1}})^+/\rho_X.$$
