= Symmetric closure =

In mathematics, the symmetric closure of a binary relation $R$ on a set $X$ is the smallest symmetric relation on $X$ that contains $R.$

For example, if $X$ is a set of airports and $xRy$ means "there is a direct flight from airport $x$ to airport $y$", then the symmetric closure of $R$ is the relation "there is a direct flight either from $x$ to $y$ or from $y$ to $x$". Or, if $X$ is the set of humans and $R$ is the relation 'parent of', then the symmetric closure of $R$ is the relation "$x$ is a parent or a child of $y$".

== Definition ==
The symmetric closure $S$ of a relation $R$ on a set $X$ is given by
$$S = R \cup \{ (y, x) : (x, y) \in R \}.$$

In other words, the symmetric closure of $R$ is the union of $R$ with its converse relation, $R^{\operatorname{T}}.$

== See also ==
- Transitive closure – Smallest transitive relation containing a given binary relation
- Reflexive closure
