= Reflexive closure =

In mathematics, the reflexive closure of a binary relation $R$ on a set $X$ is the smallest reflexive relation on $X$ that contains $R$, i.e. the set $R \cup \{(x,x) \mid x \in X \}$.

For example, if $X$ is a set of distinct numbers and $x R y$ means "$x$ is less than $y$", then the reflexive closure of $R$ is the relation "$x$ is less than or equal to $y$".

== Definition ==
The reflexive closure $S$ of a relation $R$ on a set $X$ is given by
$$S = R \cup \{(x, x) \mid x \in X\}$$

In plain English, the reflexive closure of $R$ is the union of $R$ with the identity relation on $X.$

== Example ==
As an example, if
$$X = \{1, 2, 3, 4\}$$
$$R = \{(1,1), (1,3), (2,2), (3,3), (4,4)\}$$
then the relation $R$ is already reflexive by itself, so it does not differ from its reflexive closure.

However, if any of the reflexive pairs in $R$ was absent, it would be inserted for the reflexive closure. For example, if on the same set $X$
$$R = \{(1,1), (1,3), (2,2), (4,4)\}$$
then the reflexive closure is
$$S = R \cup \{(x,x) \mid x \in X\} = \{(1,1), (1,3), (2,2), (3,3), (4,4)\} .$$

== See also ==
- Symmetric closure
- Transitive closure – Smallest transitive relation containing a given binary relation
