= Julian day =

Days since the beginning of the Julian Period

Today (at UTC+00)
- Tuesday, 13 October 2026
- Julian day: 2461327
Other calendars
| Akan | Monobene |
| Armenian | 25 Sahmi 1476 |
| Aztec | Izcalli 11, 4 Cuetzpalin |
| Babylonian | 30 Ululu, 2337 SE |
| Balinese pawukon | Menga, Kajeng, Laba, Pon, Maulu, Anggara of Kelawu, Brahma, Dadi, Pandita |
| Bengali | 28 Ashshin, BS 1433 |
| Chinese | Yang Metal Monkey・Wings Mansion; Fire Horse Year, Month 9, Day 4 (Hanlu, 10 days until Shuangjiang) |
| Common Era | 13 October 2026 CE |
| Coptic | 3 Paopi, AM 1743 |
| Egyptian | 30 Mechir, 2775 NE |
| Ethiopian | 3 Ṭeqemt, 2019 Amätä Məhrät |
| French Republican | Décade III, Primidi de Vendémiaire de l'Année 235 de la République |
| Gregorian | 13 October, AD 2026 |
| Hebrew | 2 Cheshvan, AM 5787 |
| Hindu | Viśākhā・Prīti; Solar: 27 Āśvina, 1948 SE; Lunisolar: Tr̥tīyā, Śukla pakṣa of Āśvina, 2083 VE; Rāudra・5127 KY・1,872,861 |
| Icelandic | Þriðjudagur, 20 Haustmánuður 2026 |
| Islamic | 1 Jumada al-awwal, AH 1448 (using tabular method) |
| ISO week date | 2026-W42-2 |
| Japanese | 3 Nagatsuki, Reiwa 8 (Kanro, 10 days until Sōkō) |
| Julian | 30 September, AD 2026 (AM 7534) |
| Korean | 3 Gaedal, 4359 DE |
| Maya | 13.0.14.0.4; 17 Yax, 4 Kan |
| Roman | Pridie Kalendas Octobres, MMDCCLXXIX AUC |
| Solar Hijri | 21 Mehr, SH 1405 |
| Tibetan | 3 tha skar, me pho rta 2153 or 1772 or 1000 |

The Julian day is a continuous count of days from the beginning of the Julian period; it is used primarily by astronomers, and in software for easily calculating elapsed days between two events (e.g., food production date and expiration date).

The Julian period is a chronological interval of 7980 years, derived from three multi-year cycles: the indiction, solar, and lunar cycles. The last year that was simultaneously the beginning of all three cycles was 4713 BC (−4712), so that is year 1 of the current Julian period, making AD 2026 year 6739 of that Period. The next Julian period begins in the year AD 3268. Historians used the period to identify Julian calendar years within which an event occurred when no such year was given in the historical record, or when the year given by previous historians was incorrect.

The Julian day number (JDN) has the same epoch as the Julian period, but counts the number of days since the epoch rather than the number of years since then. Specifically, Julian day number 0 is assigned to the day starting at noon Universal Time on Monday, 1 January 4713 BC, proleptic Julian calendar (24 November 4714 BC, in the proleptic Gregorian calendar). (Note: Both of these dates are years of the Anno Domini or Common Era (which has no year 0 between 1 BC and AD 1). Astronomical calculations generally include a year 0, so these dates should be adjusted accordingly (i.e. the year 4713 BC becomes astronomical year number −4712, etc.). In this article, dates before 15 October 1582, are in the (possibly proleptic) Julian calendar and dates on or after 15 October 1582, are in the Gregorian calendar, unless otherwise labelled.) For example, the Julian day number for the day starting at 12:00 UT (noon) on 1 January 2000, was 2451545.

The Julian date (JD) of any instant is the Julian day number plus the fraction of a day since the preceding noon in Universal Time. Julian dates are expressed as a Julian day number with a decimal fraction added. For example, the Julian Date for 00:30:00.0 UT 1 January 2013, is 2456293.520833. This article was loaded at 2026-10-13 23:26:31 (UTC) – expressed as a Julian date this is 2461327.4767477.

== Terminology ==
The term Julian date may also refer, outside of astronomy, to the day-of-year number (more properly, the ordinal date) in the Gregorian calendar, especially in computer programming, the military and the food industry, or it may refer to dates in the Julian calendar. For example, if a given "Julian date" is "5 October 1582", this means that date is in the Julian calendar (which was 15 October 1582, in the Gregorian calendar – the date it was first established). Without an astronomical or historical context, a "Julian date" given as "36" most likely means the 36th day of a given Gregorian year, namely 5 February. Other possible meanings of a "Julian date" of "36" include an astronomical Julian Day Number, or the year AD 36 in the Julian calendar, or a duration of 36 astronomical Julian years. This is why the terms "ordinal date" or "day-of-year" are preferred. In contexts where a "Julian date" means simply an ordinal date, calendars of a Gregorian year with formatting for ordinal dates are often called "Julian calendars", but this could also mean that the calendars are of years in the Julian calendar system.

Historically, Julian dates were recorded relative to Greenwich Mean Time (GMT) (later, Ephemeris Time), but since 1997 the International Astronomical Union has recommended that Julian dates be specified in Terrestrial Time. Seidelmann indicates that Julian dates may be used with International Atomic Time (TAI), Terrestrial Time (TT), Barycentric Coordinate Time (TCB), or Coordinated Universal Time (UTC) and that the scale should be indicated when the difference is significant. The fraction of the day is found by converting the number of hours, minutes, and seconds after noon into the equivalent decimal fraction. Time intervals calculated from differences of Julian Dates specified in non-uniform time scales, such as UTC, may need to be corrected for changes in time scales (e.g. leap seconds).

== Variants ==
Because the starting point or reference epoch is so long ago, numbers in the Julian day can be quite large and cumbersome. A more recent starting point is sometimes used, for instance by dropping the leading digits, in order to fit into limited computer memory with an adequate amount of precision. In the following table, times are given in 24-hour notation.

In the table below, Epoch refers to the point in time used to set the origin (usually zero, but (1) where explicitly indicated) of the alternative convention being discussed in that row. The date given is a Gregorian calendar date unless otherwise specified. JD stands for Julian Date. 0h is 00:00 midnight, 12h is 12:00 noon, UT unless otherwise specified. Current value is at 23:26, Tuesday, October 13, 2026 (UTC) and may be cached. []

| Name | Epoch | Calculation | Current value | Notes |
|---|---|---|---|---|
| Julian date | 12:00 1 January 4713 BC proleptic Julian calendar | JD | 2461327.47639 | |
| Reduced JD | 12:00 16 November 1858 | JD − 2400000 | 61327.47639 | |
| Modified JD | 0:00 17 November 1858 | JD − 2400000.5 | 61326.97639 | Introduced by SAO in 1957 |
| Truncated JD | 0:00 24 May 1968 | floor(JD − 2440000.5) | 21326 | Introduced by NASA in 1979 |
| Dublin JD | 12:00 31 December 1899 | JD − 2415020 | 46307.47639 | Introduced by the IAU in 1955 |
| CNES JD | 0:00 1 January 1950 | JD − 2433282.5 | 28044.97639 | Introduced by the CNES |
| CCSDS JD | 0:00 1 January 1958 | JD − 2436204.5 | 25122.97639 | Introduced by the CCSDS |
| Modified JD2000 (MJD2000) | 0:00 1 January 2000 | JD - 2451544.5 | 9782.97639 | Introduced by ESA |
| Lilian date | day 1 = 15 October 1582 (Note: This is an epoch starting with day 1 instead of 0. Conventions vary as to whether this is based on UT or local time.) | floor (JD − 2299159.5) | 162167 | Count of days of the Gregorian calendar |
| Rata Die | day 1 = 1 January 1 proleptic Gregorian calendar | floor (JD − 1721424.5) | 739902 | Count of days of the Common Era |
| Mars Sol Date | 12:00 29 December 1873 | (JD − 2405522)/1.02749 | 54312.36168 | Count of Martian days |
| Unix time | 0:00 1 January 1970 | (JD − 2440587.5) × 86400 | 1791933991 | Count of seconds, excluding leap seconds |
| JavaScript Date | 0:00 1 January 1970 | (JD − 2440587.5) × 86400000 | 1791933991001 | Count of milliseconds, excluding leap seconds |
| EXT4 File Timestamps | 0:00 1 January 1970 | (JD − 2440587.5) × 86400000000000 | 1.7919339910013×10^{+18} | Count of nanoseconds, excluding leap seconds |
| .NET DateTime | 0:00 1 January 1 proleptic Gregorian calendar | (JD − 1721425.5) × 864000000000 | 639275307910012800 | Count of 100-nanosecond ticks, excluding ticks attributable to leap seconds |

- The Modified Julian Date (MJD) was introduced by the Smithsonian Astrophysical Observatory in 1957 to record the orbit of Sputnik via an IBM 704 (36-bit machine) and using only 18 bits until 7 August 2576. MJD is the epoch of VAX/VMS and its successor OpenVMS, using 63-bit date/time, which allows times to be stored up to 31 July 31086, 02:48:05.47. The MJD has a starting point of midnight on 17 November 1858, and is computed by MJD = JD − 2400000.5
- The Truncated Julian Day (TJD) was introduced by NASA/Goddard in 1979 as part of a parallel grouped binary time code (PB-5) "designed specifically, although not exclusively, for spacecraft applications". TJD was a 4-digit day count from MJD 40000, which was 24 May 1968, represented as a 14-bit binary number. Since this code was limited to four digits, TJD recycled to zero on MJD 50000, or 10 October 1995, "which gives a long ambiguity period of 27.4 years". (NASA codes PB-1–PB-4 used a 3-digit day-of-year count.) Only whole days are represented. Time of day is expressed by a count of seconds of a day, plus optional milliseconds, microseconds and nanoseconds in separate fields. Later PB-5J was introduced which increased the TJD field to 16 bits, allowing values up to 65535, which will occur in the year 2147. There are five digits recorded after TJD 9999.
- The Dublin Julian Date (DJD) is the number of days that has elapsed since the epoch of the solar and lunar ephemerides used from 1900 through 1983, Newcomb's Tables of the Sun and Ernest W. Brown's Tables of the Motion of the Moon (1919). This epoch was noon UT on January 0, 1900, which is the same as noon UT on 31 December 1899. The DJD was defined by the International Astronomical Union at their meeting in Dublin, Ireland, in 1955.
- The Lilian day number is a count of days of the Gregorian calendar and not defined relative to the Julian Date. It is an integer applied to a whole day; day 1 was 15 October 1582, which was the day the Gregorian calendar went into effect. The original paper defining it makes no mention of the time zone, and no mention of time-of-day. It was named for Aloysius Lilius, the principal author of the Gregorian calendar.
- Rata Die is a system used in Rexx, Go and Python. Some implementations or options use Universal Time, others use local time. Day 1 is 1 January 1, that is, the first day of the Christian or Common Era in the proleptic Gregorian calendar. In Rexx, 1 January is Day 0.
- The Heliocentric Julian Day (HJD) is the same as the Julian day, but adjusted to the frame of reference of the Sun, and thus can differ from the Julian day by as much as 8.3 minutes (498 seconds), that being the time it takes light to reach Earth from the Sun. (Note: To illustrate the ambiguity that could arise from conflating Heliocentric time and Terrestrial time, consider the two separate astronomical measurements of an astronomical object from the Earth: Assume that three objects – the Earth, the Sun, and the astronomical object targeted, that is whose distance is to be measured – happen to be in a straight line for both measures. However, for the first measurement, the Earth is between the Sun and the targeted object, and for the second, the Earth is on the opposite side of the Sun from that object. Then, the two measurements would differ by about 1000 light-seconds: For the first measurement, the Earth is roughly 500 light seconds closer to the target than the Sun, and roughly 500 light seconds further from the target astronomical object than the Sun for the second measure. An error of about 1000 light-seconds is over 1% of a light-day, which can be a significant error when measuring temporal phenomena for short period astronomical objects over long time intervals. To clarify this issue, the ordinary Julian day is sometimes referred to as the Geocentric Julian Day (GJD) in order to distinguish it from HJD.)

== History ==
=== Julian period ===
The Julian day number is based on the Julian period proposed by Joseph Scaliger, a classical scholar, in 1583 (one year after the Gregorian calendar reform) as it is the product of three calendar cycles used with the Julian calendar:

28 (solar cycle) × 19 (lunar cycle) × 15 (indiction cycle) = 7980 years

Its epoch occurs when all three cycles (if they are continued backward far enough) were in their first year together. Years of the Julian period are counted from this year, 4713 BC, as year 1, which was chosen to be before any historical record.

Scaliger corrected chronology by assigning each year a tricyclic "character", three numbers indicating that year's position in the 28-year solar cycle, the 19-year lunar cycle, and the 15-year indiction cycle. One or more of these numbers often appeared in the historical record alongside other pertinent facts without any mention of the Julian calendar year. The character of every year in the historical record was unique – it could only belong to one year in the 7980-year Julian period. Scaliger determined that 1 BC or year 0 was Julian period (JP) 4713. He knew that 1 BC or year 0 had the character 9 of the solar cycle, 1 of the lunar cycle, and 3 of the indiction cycle. By inspecting a 532-year Paschal cycle with 19 solar cycles (each of 28 years, each year numbered 1–28) and 28 lunar cycles (each of 19 years, each year numbered 1–19), he determined that the first two numbers, 9 and 1, occurred at its year 457. He then calculated via remainder division that he needed to add eight 532-year Paschal cycles totaling 4256 years before the cycle containing 1 BC or year 0 in order for its year 457 to be indiction 3. The sum 4256 + 457 was thus JP 4713.

A formula for determining the year of the Julian period given its character involving three four-digit numbers was published by Jacques de Billy in 1665 in the Philosophical Transactions of the Royal Society (its first year). John F. W. Herschel gave the same formula using slightly different wording in his 1849 Outlines of Astronomy.

Multiply the Solar Cycle by 4845, and the Lunar, by 4200, and that of the Indiction, by 6916. Then divide the Sum of the products by 7980, which is the Julian Period: The Remainder of the Division, without regard to the Quotient, shall be the year enquired after.

— Jacques de Billy

Carl Friedrich Gauss introduced the modulo operation in 1801, restating de Billy's formula as:

Julian Period year = (6916a + 4200b + 4845c) MOD 15×19×28

where a is the year of the indiction cycle, b of the lunar cycle, and c of the solar cycle.

John Collins described the details of how these three numbers were calculated in 1666, using many trials. A summary of Collin's description is in a footnote. Reese, Everett and Craun reduced the dividends in the Try column from 285, 420, 532 to 5, 2, 7 and changed remainder to modulo, but apparently still required many trials.

The specific cycles used by Scaliger to form his tricyclic Julian period were, first, the indiction cycle with a first year of 313. (Note: All years in this paragraph are those of the Anno Domini Era at the time of Easter) Then he chose the dominant 19-year Alexandrian lunar cycle with a first year of 285, the Era of Martyrs and the Diocletian Era epoch, or a first year of 532 according to Dionysius Exiguus. Finally, Scaliger chose the post-Bedan solar cycle with a first year of 776, when its first quadrennium of concurrents, 1 2 3 4, began in sequence. (Note: The concurrent of any Julian year is the weekday of its March 24, numbered from Sunday=1.) Although not their intended use, the equations of de Billy or Gauss can be used to determined the first year of any 15-, 19-, and 28-year tricyclic period given any first years of their cycles. For those of the Julian period, the result is AD 3268, because both remainder and modulo usually return the lowest positive result. Thus 7980 years must be subtracted from it to yield the first year of the present Julian period, −4712 or 4713 BC, when all three of its sub-cycles are in their first years.

Scaliger got the idea of using a tricyclic period from "the Greeks of Constantinople" as Herschel stated in his quotation below in Julian day numbers. Specifically, the monk and priest Georgios wrote in 638/39 that the Byzantine year 6149 AM (640/41) had indiction 14, lunar cycle 12, and solar cycle 17, which places the first year of the Byzantine Era in 5509/08 BC, the Byzantine Creation. Dionysius Exiguus called the Byzantine lunar cycle his "lunar cycle" in argumentum 6, in contrast with the Alexandrian lunar cycle which he called his "nineteen-year cycle" in argumentum 5.

Although many references say that the Julian in "Julian period" refers to Scaliger's father, Julius Scaliger, at the beginning of Book V of his Opus de Emendatione Temporum ("Work on the Emendation of Time") he states, "Iulianam vocauimus: quia ad annum Iulianum accomodata", (Note: Scaliger used these words in his 1629 edition on p. 361 and in his 1598 edition on p. 339. In 1583 he used "Iulianam vocauimus: quia ad annum Iulianum duntaxat accomodata est" on p. 198.) which Reese, Everett and Craun translate as "We have termed it Julian because it fits the Julian year". Thus Julian refers to the Julian calendar.

=== Julian day numbers ===
Julian days were first used by Ludwig Ideler for the first days of the Nabonassar and Christian eras in his 1825 Handbuch der mathematischen und technischen Chronologie. (Note: The Nabonassar day was elapsed with a typo – it was correctly printed later as 1448638. The Christian day (1721425) was current, not elapsed.) John F. W. Herschel then developed them for astronomical use in his 1849 Outlines of Astronomy, after acknowledging that Ideler was his guide.

The period thus arising of 7980 Julian years, is called the Julian period, and it has been found so useful, that the most competent authorities have not hesitated to declare that, through its employment, light and order were first introduced into chronology. We owe its invention or revival to Joseph Scaliger, who is said to have received it from the Greeks of Constantinople. The first year of the current Julian period, or that of which the number in each of the three subordinate cycles is 1, was the year 4713 BC, and the noon of 1 January of that year, for the meridian of Alexandria, is the chronological epoch, to which all historical eras are most readily and intelligibly referred, by computing the number of integer days intervening between that epoch and the noon (for Alexandria) of the day, which is reckoned to be the first of the particular era in question. The meridian of Alexandria is chosen as that to which Ptolemy refers the commencement of the era of Nabonassar, the basis of all his calculations.

At least one mathematical astronomer adopted Herschel's "days of the Julian period" immediately. Benjamin Peirce of Harvard University used over 2,800 Julian days in his Tables of the Moon, begun in 1849 but not published until 1853, to calculate the lunar ephemerides in the new American Ephemeris and Nautical Almanac from 1855 to 1888. The days are specified for "Washington mean noon", with Greenwich defined as 18^{h} 51^{m} 48^{s} west of Washington (282°57′W, or Washington 77°3′W of Greenwich). A table with 197 Julian days ("Date in Mean Solar Days", one per century mostly) was included for the years –4713 to 2000 with no year 0, thus "–" means BC, including decimal fractions for hours, minutes, and seconds. The same table appears in Tables of Mercury by Joseph Winlock, without any other Julian days.

The national ephemerides started to include a multi-year table of Julian days, under various names, for either every year or every leap year beginning with the French Connaissance des Temps in 1870 for 2,620 years, increasing in 1899 to 3,000 years. The British Nautical Almanac began in 1879 with 2,000 years. The Berliner Astronomisches Jahrbuch began in 1899 with 2,000 years. The American Ephemeris was the last to add a multi-year table, in 1925 with 2,000 years. However, it was the first to include any mention of Julian days with one for the year of issue beginning in 1855, as well as later scattered sections with many days in the year of issue. It was also the first to use the name "Julian day number" in 1918. The Nautical Almanac began in 1866 to include a Julian day for every day in the year of issue. The Connaissance des Temps began in 1871 to include a Julian day for every day in the year of issue.

The French mathematician and astronomer Pierre-Simon Laplace first expressed the time of day as a decimal fraction added to calendar dates in his book, Traité de Mécanique Céleste, in 1823. Other astronomers added fractions of the day to the Julian day number to create Julian Dates, which are typically used by astronomers to date astronomical observations, thus eliminating the complications resulting from using standard calendar periods like eras, years, or months. They were first introduced into variable star work in 1860 by the English astronomer Norman Pogson, which he stated was at the suggestion of John Herschel. They were popularized for variable stars by Edward Charles Pickering, of the Harvard College Observatory, in 1890.

Julian days begin at noon because when Herschel recommended them, the astronomical day began at noon. The astronomical day had begun at noon ever since Ptolemy chose to begin the days for his astronomical observations at noon. He chose noon because the transit of the Sun across the observer's meridian occurs at the same apparent time every day of the year, unlike sunrise or sunset, which vary by several hours. Midnight was not even considered because it could not be accurately determined using water clocks. Nevertheless, he double-dated most nighttime observations with both Egyptian days beginning at sunrise and Babylonian days beginning at sunset. Medieval Muslim astronomers used days beginning at sunset, so astronomical days beginning at noon did produce a single date for an entire night. Later medieval European astronomers used Roman days beginning at midnight so astronomical days beginning at noon also allow observations during an entire night to use a single date. When all astronomers decided to start their astronomical days at midnight to conform to the beginning of the civil day, on 1 January 1925, it was decided to keep Julian days continuous with previous practice, beginning at noon.

During this period, usage of Julian day numbers as a neutral intermediary when converting a date in one calendar into a date in another calendar also occurred. An isolated use was by Ebenezer Burgess in his 1860 translation of the Surya Siddhanta wherein he stated that the beginning of the Kali Yuga era occurred at midnight at the meridian of Ujjain at the end of the 588,465th day and the beginning of the 588,466th day (civil reckoning) of the Julian Period, or between 17 and 18 February JP 1612 or 3102 BC. Robert Schram was notable beginning with his 1882 Hilfstafeln für Chronologie. Here he used about 5,370 "days of the Julian Period". He greatly expanded his usage of Julian days in his 1908 Kalendariographische und Chronologische Tafeln containing over 530,000 Julian days, one for the zeroth day of every month over thousands of years in many calendars. He included over 25,000 negative Julian days, given in a positive form by adding 10,000,000 to each. He called them "day of the Julian Period", "Julian day", or simply "day" in his discussion, but no name was used in the tables. Continuing this tradition, in his book "Mapping Time: The Calendar and Its History" British physics educator and programmer Edward Graham Richards uses Julian day numbers to convert dates from one calendar into another using algorithms rather than tables.

== Julian day number calculation ==
The Julian day number can be calculated using the following formulas (integer division rounding towards zero is used exclusively, that is, positive values are rounded down and negative values are rounded up): (Note: Doggett in Seidenmann 1992, p. 603, indicates the algorithms are inspired by Fliegel & Van Flanderen 1968. That paper gives algorithms in Fortran. The Fortran computer language performs integer division by truncating, which is functionally equivalent to rounding toward zero.)

The months January to December are numbered 1 to 12. For the year, astronomical year numbering is used, thus 1 BC is 0, 2 BC is −1, and 4713 BC is −4712. JDN is the Julian Day Number. Use the previous day of the month if trying to find the JDN of an instant before midday UT.

=== Converting Gregorian calendar date to Julian day number ===
The algorithm is valid for all (possibly proleptic) Gregorian calendar dates after 23 November −4713. Divisions are integer divisions towards zero; fractional parts are ignored.

$\text{JDN} = \frac{1461 \cdot \left( \text{Y} + 4800 + \frac{\text{M}-14}{12} \right)}{4} + \frac{367 \cdot \left( \text{M} - 2 - 12 \cdot \frac{\text{M}-14}{12} \right)}{12} - \frac{3 \cdot \frac{\text{Y} + 4900 + \frac{\text{M} - 14}{12}}{100}}{4} + \text{D} - 32075$

=== Converting Julian calendar date to Julian day number ===
The algorithm is valid for all (possibly proleptic) Julian calendar years ≥ −4712, that is, for all JDN ≥ 0. Divisions are integer divisions, fractional parts are ignored.

$\text{JDN} = 367 \cdot \text{Y} - \frac{7 \cdot \left(\text{Y} + 5001 + \frac{\text{M} - 9}{7}\right)}{4} + \frac{275 \cdot \text{M}}{9} + D + 1729777$

=== Finding Julian date given Julian day number and time of day ===
For the full Julian Date of a moment after 12:00 UT one can use the following. Divisions are real numbers.

$$\begin{matrix}J\!D & = & J\!D\!N + \frac{\text{hour} - 12}{24} + \frac{\text{minute}}{1440} + \frac{\text{second}}{86400}\end{matrix}$$

So, for example, 1 January 2000, at 18:00:00 UT corresponds to JD = 2451545.25 and 1 January 2000, at 6:00:00 UT corresponds to JD = 2451544.75.

=== Finding day of week given Julian day number ===
Because a Julian day starts at noon while a civil day starts at midnight, the Julian day number needs to be adjusted to find the day of week: for a point in time in a given Julian day after midnight UT and before 12:00 UT, add 1 or use the JDN of the next afternoon.

The US day of the week W1 (for an afternoon or evening UT) can be determined from the Julian Day Number J with the expression:

W1 = mod(J + 1, 7)

| W1 | 0 | 1 | 2 | 3 | 4 | 5 | 6 |
| Day of the week | Sun | Mon | Tue | Wed | Thu | Fri | Sat |

If the moment in time is after midnight UT (and before 12:00 UT), then one is already in the next day of the week.

The ISO day of the week W0 can be determined from the Julian Day Number J with the expression:

W0 = mod (J, 7) + 1

| W0 | 1 | 2 | 3 | 4 | 5 | 6 | 7 |
| Day of the week | Mon | Tue | Wed | Thu | Fri | Sat | Sun |

=== Julian or Gregorian calendar from Julian day number ===
This is an algorithm by Edward Graham Richards to convert a Julian Day Number, J, to a date in the Gregorian calendar (proleptic, when applicable). Richards states the algorithm is valid for Julian day numbers greater than or equal to 0. All variables are integer values, and the notation "a div b" indicates integer division, and "mod(a, b)" denotes the modulus operator.

Algorithm parameters for Gregorian calendar
| variable | value | variable | value |
|---|---|---|---|
| y | 4716 | v | 3 |
| j | 1401 | u | 5 |
| m | 2 | s | 153 |
| n | 12 | w | 2 |
| r | 4 | B | 274277 |
| p | 1461 | C | −38 |

For Julian calendar:

1. f = J + j

For Gregorian calendar:

1. f = J + j + (((4 × J + B) div 146097) × 3) div 4 + C

For Julian or Gregorian, continue:

2. e = r × f + v
3. g = mod(e, p) div r
4. h = u × g + w
5. D = (mod(h, s)) div u + 1
6. M = mod(h div s + m, n) + 1
7. Y = (e div p) - y + (n + m - M) div n

D, M, and Y are the numbers of the day, month, and year respectively for the afternoon at the beginning of the given Julian day.

=== Julian period from indiction, Metonic and solar cycles ===
Let Y be the year BC or AD and i, m, and s respectively its positions in the indiction, Metonic and solar cycles. Divide 6916i + 4200m + 4845s by 7980 and call the remainder r.

If r > 4713, Y = (r − 4713) and is a year AD.
If r < 4714, Y = (4714 − r) and is a year BC.

Example

i = 8, m = 2, s = 8. What is the year?

(6916 × 8) = 55328; (4200 × 2) = 8400: (4845 × 8) = 38760. 55328 + 8400 + 38760 = 102488.
102488/7980 = 12 remainder 6728.
Y = (6728 − 4713) = AD 2015.

== Julian date calculation ==
As stated above, the Julian date (JD) of any instant is the Julian day number for the preceding noon in Universal Time plus the fraction of the day since that instant. Ordinarily calculating the fractional portion of the JD is straightforward; the number of seconds that have elapsed in the day divided by the number of seconds in a day, 86,400. But if the UTC timescale is being used, a day containing a positive leap second contains 86,401 seconds (or in the unlikely event of a negative leap second, 86,399 seconds). One authoritative source, the Standards of Fundamental Astronomy (SOFA), deals with this issue by treating days containing a leap second as having a different length (86,401 or 86,399 seconds, as required). SOFA refers to the result of such a calculation as "quasi-JD".

== See also ==
- Barycentric Julian Date – Julian date corrected for the barycenter of the Solar System
- Dual dating – Date given in two different calendars
- Decimal time – Time of day using decimal units
- Epoch (astronomy) – Moment in time used as a reference point in astronomy
- Epoch (reference date) – Reference point from which time is measured
- Era – Span of time defined for the purposes of chronology or historiography
  - Calendar era – Date system of time since an epoch event
- J2000 – the epoch that starts on JD 2451545.0 (TT), the standard epoch used in astronomy since 1984
- Julian year (astronomy) – Interval of exactly 365.25 Earth days
- Julian year (calendar) – A year in the Julian calendar
- Lunation Number – First lunar phase, the definition varies
- Ordinal date – Date written as number of days since first day of year
- Time – Continuous progression from past to future
- Time standard – Specification for measuring time
- Zeller's congruence – Algorithm to calculate the day of the week

== Notes ==
Calculation of 4845, 4200, 6916 by Collins
| | Try 2+ until | |
| 7980/28 = 19×15 = 285 | 285×Try/28 = remainder 1 | 285×17 = 19×15×17 = 4845 |
| 7980/19 = 28×15 = 420 | 420×Try/19 = remainder 1 | 420×10 = 28×15×10 = 4200 |
| 7980/15 = 28×19 = 532 | 532×Try/15 = remainder 1 | 532×13 = 28×19×13 = 6916 |

== Sources ==
- Alsted, Johann Heinrich 1649 [1630]. Encyclopaedia (in Latin), Tome 4, Page 122.
- American Ephemeris and Nautical Almanac, Washington, 1855–1980, HathiTrust
- Astronomical almanac for the year 2001. (2000). U.S. Nautical Almanac Office and Her Majesty's Nautical Almanac Office. ISBN 9780117728431.
- Astronomical almanac for the year 2017. (2016). U.S. Naval Observatory and Her Majesty's Nautical Almanac Office. ISBN 978-0-7077-41666.
- Astronomical Almanac Online Archived 24 December 2016 at the Wayback Machine. (2016). U.S. Nautical Almanac Office and Her Majesty's Nautical Almanac Office.
- Bede: The Reckoning of Time, tr. Faith Wallis, 725/1999, pp. 392–404, ISBN 0-85323-693-3. Also Appendix 2 (Beda Venerabilis' Paschal table.
- Blackburn, Bonnie; Holford-Strevens, Leofranc. (1999) The Oxford Companion to the Year, Oxford University Press, ISBN 0-19-214231-3.
- Burgess, Ebenezer, translator. 1860. Translation of the Surya Siddhanta. Journal of the American Oriental Society 6 (1858–1860) 141–498, p. 161.
- Berliner astronomisches Jahrbuch, Berlin, 1776–1922, HathiTrust
- Chi, A. R. (December 1979). "A Grouped Binary Time Code for Telemetry and Space Application" (NASA Technical Memorandum 80606). Retrieved from NASA Technical Reports Server 24 April 2015.
- Collins, John (1666–1667). "A method for finding the number of the Julian Period for any year assign'd", Philosophical Transactions of the Royal Society, series 1665–1678, volume 2, pp. 568–575.
- Connaissance des Temps 1689–1922, HathiTrust table of contents at end of book
- Chronicon Paschale 284–628 AD, tr. Michael Whitby, Mary Whitby, 1989, p. 10, ISBN 978-0-85323-096-0.
- "CS 1063 Introduction to Programming: Explanation of Julian Day Number Calculation." Archived 3 December 2020 at the Wayback Machine (2011). Computer Science Department, University of Texas at San Antonio.
- "De argumentis lunæ libellus" in Patrologia Latina, 90: 701–728, col. 705D (in Latin).
- de Billy (1665–1666). "A problem for finding the year of the Julian Period by a new and very easie method", Philosophical Transactions of the Royal Society, series 1665–1678, volume 1, p. 324.
- Leo Depuydt, "AD 297 as the first indiction cycle",The bulletin of the American Society of Papyrologists, 24 (1987), 137–139.
- Dershowitz, N. & Reingold, E. M. (2008). Calendrical Calculations 3rd ed. Cambridge University Press. ISBN 978-0-521-70238-6.
- Franz Diekamp, "Der Mönch und Presbyter Georgios, ein unbekannter Schriftsteller des 7. Jahrhunderts", Byzantinische Zeitschrift 9 (1900) 14–51 (in German and Greek).
- Digital Equipment Corporation. Why is Wednesday, 17 November 1858, the base time for VAX/VMS? Modified Julian Day explanation
- Dionysius Exiguus, 1863 [525], Cyclus Decemnovennalis Dionysii, Patrologia Latina vol. 67, cols. 493–508 (in Latin).
- Dionysius Exiguus, 2003 [525], tr. Michael Deckers, Nineteen year cycle of Dionysius, Argumentum 5 (in Latin and English).
- Explanatory Supplement to the Astronomical Ephemeris and the American Ephemeris and Nautical Almanac, Her Majesty's Stationery Office, 1961, pp. 21, 71, 97, 100, 264, 351, 365, 376, 386–389, 392, 431, 437–441, 489.
- Fliegel, Henry F. & Van Flanderen, Thomas C. (October 1968). "A machine algorithm for processing calendar dates". Communications of the Association for Computing Machinery Vol. 11, No. 10, p. 657.
- Furness, Caroline Ellen (1915). An introduction to the study of variable stars. Boston: Houghton-Mifflin. Vassar Semi-Centennial Series.
- Gauss, Carl Frederich (1966). Clarke, Arthur A., translator. Disquisitiones Arithmeticae. Article 36. pp. 16–17. Yale University Press. (in English)
- Gauss, Carl Frederich (1801). Disquisitiones Arithmeticae. Article 36. pp. 25–26. (in Latin)
- Grafton, Anthony T. (May 1975) "Joseph Scaliger and historical chronology: The rise and fall of a discipline", History and Theory 14/2 pp. 156–185. JSTOR 2504611
- Grafton, Anthony T. (1994) Joseph Scaliger: A Study in the History of Classical Scholarship. Volume II: Historical Chronology (Oxford-Warburg Studies).
- Venance Grumel, La chronologie, 1958, 31–55 (in French).
- Heath, B. (1760). Astronomia accurata; or the royal astronomer and navigator. London: author. [Google Books version.
- Herschel, John F. W. (1849), Outlines of Astronomy (2nd ed.), London, hdl:2027/njp.32101032311266. Herschel's words remained the same in all editions, even while the page varied.
- Hopkins, Jeffrey L. (2013). Using Commercial Amateur Astronomical Spectrographs, p. 257, Springer Science & Business Media, ISBN 9783319014425
- HORIZONS System. (4 April 2013). NASA.
- Ideler, Ludwig. Handbuch der mathematischen und technischen Chronologie, vol. 1, 1825, pp. 102–106 (in German).
- IBM 2004. "CEEDATE – convert Lilian date to character format". COBOL for AIX (2.0): Programming Guide.
- Information Bulletin No. 81 Archived 11 May 2020 at the Wayback Machine. (January 1998). International Astronomical Union.
- "Julian Date". (n.d.). Defit's Definitions of Information Technology Terms. Brainsoft.
- Julian Date Converter Archived 6 October 2007 at the Wayback Machine (20 March 2013). US Naval Observatory. Retrieved 16 September 2013.
- Kempler, Steve. (2011). Day of Year Calendar. Goddard Earth Sciences Data and Information Services Center.
- Laplace (1823). Traité de Mécanique Céleste vol. 5 p. 348 (in French)
- McCarthy, D. & Guinot, B. (2013). Time. In S. E. Urban & P. K. Seidelmann, eds. Explanatory Supplement to the Astronomical Almanac, 3rd ed. (pp. 76–104). Mill Valley, Calif.: University Science Books. ISBN 978-1-89138-985-6
- Meeus Jean. Astronomical Algorithms (1998), 2nd ed, ISBN 0-943396-61-1
- Mosshammer, Alden A. (2008), The Easter Computus and the Origins of the Christian Era, Oxford University Press, pp. 278, 281, ISBN 978-0-19-954312-0
- Moyer, Gordon. (April 1981). "The Origin of the Julian Day System", Sky and Telescope 61 311−313.
- Nautical Almanac and Astronomical Ephemeris, London, 1767–1923, HathiTrust
- Otto Neugebauer, Ethiopic Astronomy and Computus, Red Sea Press, 2016, pp. 22, 93, 111, 183, ISBN 978-1-56902-440-9. Page references in text, footnotes, and index are six greater than the page numbers in this edition.
- Noerdlinger, P. (April 1995 revised May 1996). Metadata Issues in the EOSDIS Science Data Processing Tools for Time Transformations and Geolocation. NASA Goddard Space Flight Center.
- Nothaft, C. Philipp E., Scandalous Error: Calendar Reform and Calendrical Astronomy in Medieval Europe, Oxford University Press, 2018, pp. 57–58, ISBN 978-0-19-879955-9.
- Ohms, B. G. (1986). Computer processing of dates outside the twentieth century. IBM Systems Journal 25, 244–251. doi:10.1147/sj.252.0244
- Pallé, Pere L., Esteban, Cesar. (2014). Asteroseismology, p. 185, Cambridge University Press, ISBN 9781107470620
- Pogson, Norman R. (1860), "Notes on certain variable stars of unknown or doubtful periods", Monthly Notices of the Royal Astronomical Society, xx (7): 283–285, Bibcode:1860MNRAS..20..283P, doi:10.1093/mnras/20.7.283
- Peirce, Benjamin (1865) [1853], Tables of the Moon, Washington
- Ptolemy (1998) [c. 150], Ptolemy's Almagest, translated by Gingerich, Owen, Princeton University Press, p. 12, ISBN 0-691-00260-6
- Ransom, D. H. Jr. (c. 1988) ASTROCLK Astronomical Clock and Celestial Tracking Program pp. 69–143, "Dates and the Gregorian calendar" pp. 106–111. Retrieved 10 September 2009.
- Reese, Ronald Lane; Everett, Steven M.; Craun, Edwin D. (1981). "The origin of the Julian Period: An application of congruences and the Chinese Remainder Theorem", American Journal of Physics, Vol. 49, pp. 658–661.
- "Resolution B1" Archived 26 August 2020 at the Wayback Machine. (1997). XXIIIrd General Assembly (Kyoto, Japan). International Astronomical Union, p. 7.
- Richards, E. G. (2013). Calendars. In S. E. Urban & P. K. Seidelmann, eds. Explanatory Supplement to the Astronomical Almanac, 3rd ed. (pp. 585–624). Mill Valley, Calif.: University Science Books. ISBN 978-1-89138-985-6
- Richards, E. G. (1998). Mapping Time: The Calendar and its History. Oxford University Press. ISBN 978-0192862051
- Scaliger, Joseph (1583), Opvs Novvum de Emendatione Temporvm, p. 198
- Scaliger, Joseph (1629), Opvs de Emendatione Temporvm, typis Rouerianis, p. 361
- Schram, Robert (1882), "Hilfstafeln für Chronologie", Denkschriften der Kaiserlichen Akademie der Wissenschaften, Mathematisch-Naturwissenschafteliche Classe, 45: 289–358
- Schram, Robert (1908), Kalendariographische und Chronologische Tafeln, Leipzig: J. C. Hinrichs
- "SDP Toolkit Time Notes". (21 July 2014). In SDP Toolkit / HDF-EOS. NASA.
- Seidelmann, P. Kenneth (ed.) (1992). Explanatory Supplement to the Astronomical Almanac pp. 55, 603–606. University Science Books, ISBN 0-935702-68-7.
- Seidelmann, P. Kenneth. (2013). "Introduction to Positional Astronomy" in Sean Urban and P. Kenneth Seidelmann (eds.) Explanatory supplement to the Astronomical Almanac' (3rd ed.) pp. 1–44. Mill Valley, CA: University Science Books. ISBN 978-1-891389-85-6
- "SOFA Time Scale and Calendar Tools Archived 21 March 2023 at the Wayback Machine". (14 June 2016). International Astronomical Union.
- Theveny, Pierre-Michel. (10 September 2001). "Date Format" The TPtime Handbook. Media Lab.
- Tøndering, Claus. (2014). "The Julian Period" in Frequently Asked Questions about Calendars. author.
- USDA. (c. 1963). Julian date calendar.
- US Naval Observatory. (2005, last updated 2 July 2011). Multiyear Interactive Computer Almanac 1800–2050 (ver. 2.2.2). Richmond VA: Willmann-Bell, ISBN 0-943396-84-0.
- Winkler, M. R. (n. d.). "Modified Julian Date". US Naval Observatory. Retrieved 24 April 2015.
- Winlock, Joseph (1864) [in type since 1852], Tables of Mercury, Washington, pp. introduction 8, 3–5
