= Dershowitz–Manna ordering =

In mathematics, the Dershowitz–Manna ordering is a well-founded ordering on multisets named after Nachum Dershowitz and Zohar Manna. It is often used in context of termination of programs or term rewriting systems.

Suppose that $(S, <_S)$ is a well-founded partial order and let $\mathcal{M}(S)$ be the set of all finite multisets on $S$. For multisets $M,N \in \mathcal{M}(S)$ we define the Dershowitz–Manna ordering $M <_{DM} N$ as follows:

$M <_{DM} N$ whenever there exist two multisets $X,Y \in \mathcal{M}(S)$ with the following properties:

- $X \neq \varnothing$,
- $X \subseteq N$,
- $M = (N-X)+Y$, and
- $X$ dominates $Y$, that is, for all $y \in Y$, there is some $x\in X$ such that $y <_S x$.

An equivalent definition was given by Huet and Oppen as follows:

$M <_{DM} N$ if and only if

- $M \neq N$, and
- for all $y$ in $S$, if $M(y) > N(y)$ then there is some $x$ in $S$ such that $y <_S x$ and $M(x) < N(x)$.
