= Coincidence (disambiguation) =

A coincidence is the occurrence of unrelated events in close proximity of space or time.

Coincidence may also refer to:

- Coincidence, mathematics term for a point tow mappings' domains sharing an image point; see Coincidence point
- Coincidence, scientific term for an instance of rays of light striking a surface at the same point and at the same time
- Coincidence, term for physical road bearing more than one designation; see Concurrency
- "Coincidence", a song by Sabrina Carpenter from Short n' Sweet, 2024

== Films ==
- Coincidence (1921 film), an American silent film directed by Chet Withey and starring Robert Harron
- Coincidence, alternate English title for Blind Chance, the 1987 Polish film Przypadek by Krzysztof Kieślowski
- Coincidence, English title for the 1958 film Jogajog, based on the novel Jogajog
- Coincidence, English title for the 1969 Bollywood film Ittefaq
- Coincidence, a short film distributed by General Film Company, 1915
- Coincidences (film), a French film directed by Serge Debecque, 1947

== See also ==
- Concurrency (disambiguation)
