= Pererius =

Pererius may refer to:

- Benedict Pereira (1535–1610), Spanish Jesuit philosopher, theologian, and exegete
- Isaac La Peyrère (1596–1676), French Millenarian theologian and formulator of Pre-Adamite theory
