= Edward Reingold =

American computer scientist

Edward M. Reingold (born 1945) is a computer scientist active in the fields of algorithms, data structures, graph drawing, and calendrical calculations.

In 1996 he was inducted as a Fellow of the Association for Computing Machinery.

In 2000 he retired from University of Illinois at Urbana-Champaign and was a professor of computer science and applied mathematics at the Illinois Institute of Technology until his retirement in 2019.

== Works ==
He has co-authored the standard text on calendrical calculations, Calendrical Calculations, with Nachum Dershowitz.

In 1981 he was the co-author, with John Tilford, of the canonical paper "Tidier Drawings of Trees" which described a method, now known as the Reingold-Tilford algorithm, to produce more aesthetically pleasing drawing of binary (and by extension, m-ary) trees .
