= Francesco Villamena =

Italian engraver and teacher

- Portrait of Francesco Villamena by Giovanni Battista Costantini, 1624, Rijksmuseum, Amsterdam
- Born: 1564; Venice, Papal States
- Died: 7 July 1624 (aged 59–60); Assisi, Papal States
- Education: Cornelis Cort
- Occupation: Engraver
- Years active: 1594–1624
- Movement: High Renaissance

Francesco Villamena (1564 – 7 July 1624) was an Italian engraver, drawing teacher and art collector.

== Biography ==
Francesco Villamena was born in Assisi around 1564. He settled in Rome around 1590 and studied under Cornelis Cort. According to some scholars, in his youth he was associated with Agostino Carracci. Villamena absorbed aspects of Carracci's graphic approach while also drawing inspiration from northern Mannerist engravers like Hendrick Goltzius and Jacques Bellange.

Villamena produced primarily works of religious and historical subjects. He first demonstrated his talent with an original engraving of the Last Judgement, followed in 1594 by a series of prints illustrating the life of Saint Francis. In 1599, the renowned calligrapher Ludovico Curione commissioned him to engrave a series of plates featuring typefaces accompanied by decorative frames and friezes. He was highly prolific in the following years, and many surviving examples of his work reveal him to a remarkably skilled engraver who fully understood the potential of individual strokes and cross-hatching. He employed an elegant and expressive calligraphic style with perfect control of the burin.

Attributed to him are 360 plates, including portraits, religious subjects after the masters and his own drawings. He engraved his own compositions and produced reproductions of works by Raphael, Caliari, Barocci, Muziano and Giulio Romano. Furthermore, he created several compelling book frontispieces. Villamena died in Rome on 7 July 1624.

== Gallery ==
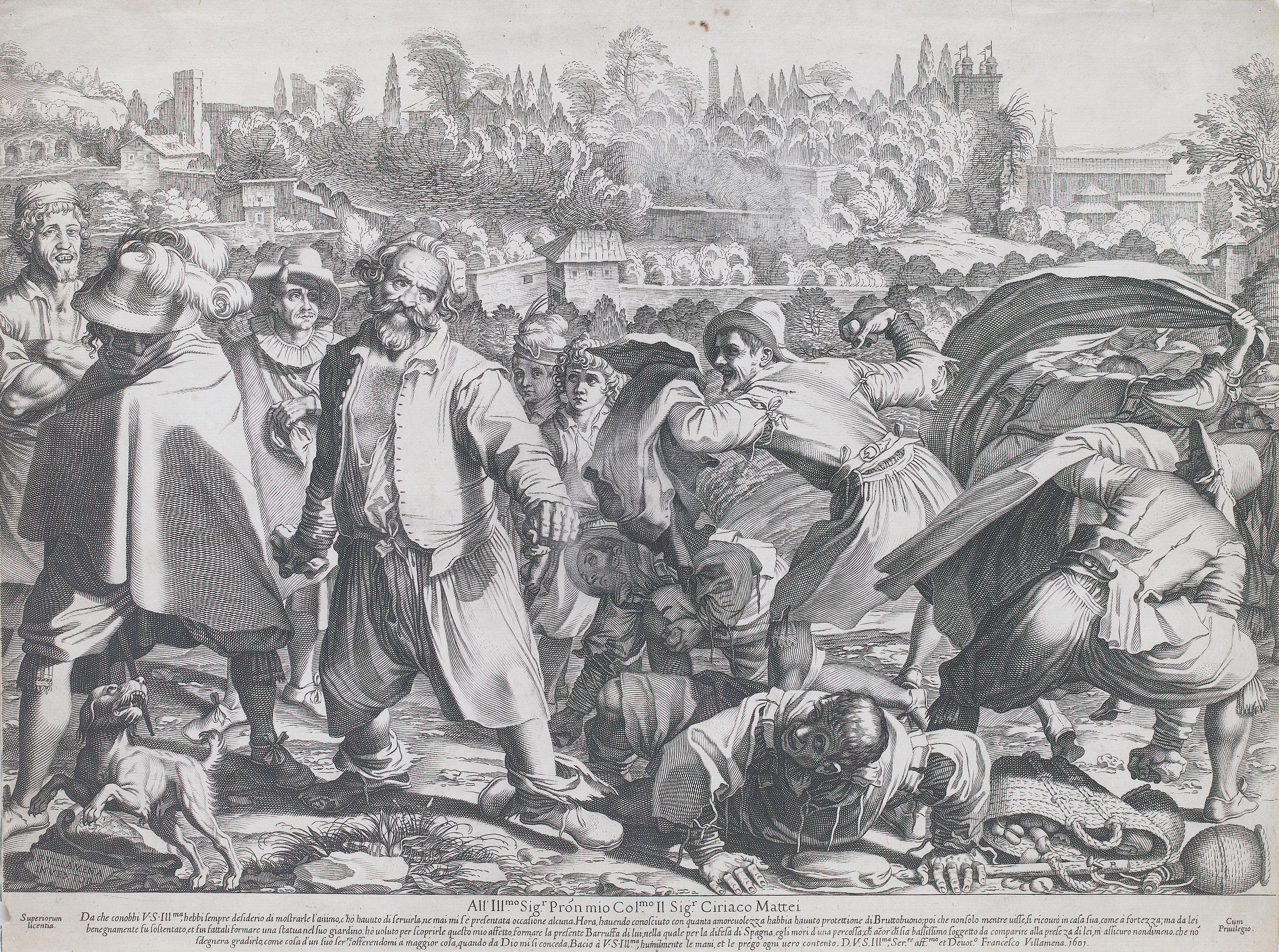
Brawl of Bruttobuono, 1601, Rhode Island School of Design Museum, Providence

The Creation of the World, 1626, Rijksmuseum, Amsterdam

The Annunciation, 1614, Rijksmuseum, Amsterdam

Christ carrying the Cross, British Museum, London

The Deposition, c. 1624, Rijksmuseum, Amsterdam

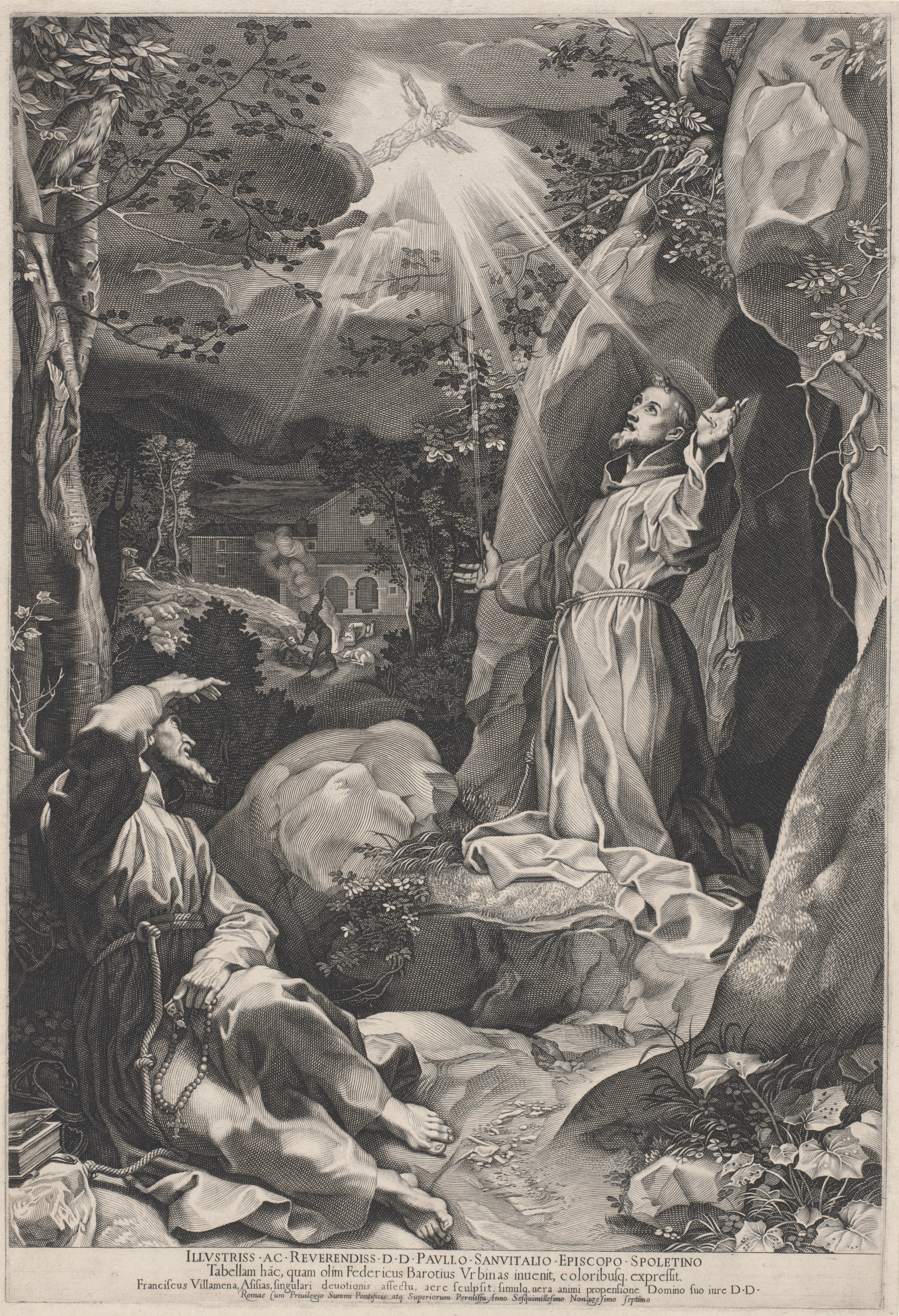
Saint Francis Receiving the Stigmata, 1597, National Gallery of Art, Washington D.C.

Portrait of Christopher Clavius, 1606, Metropolitan Museum of Art, New York

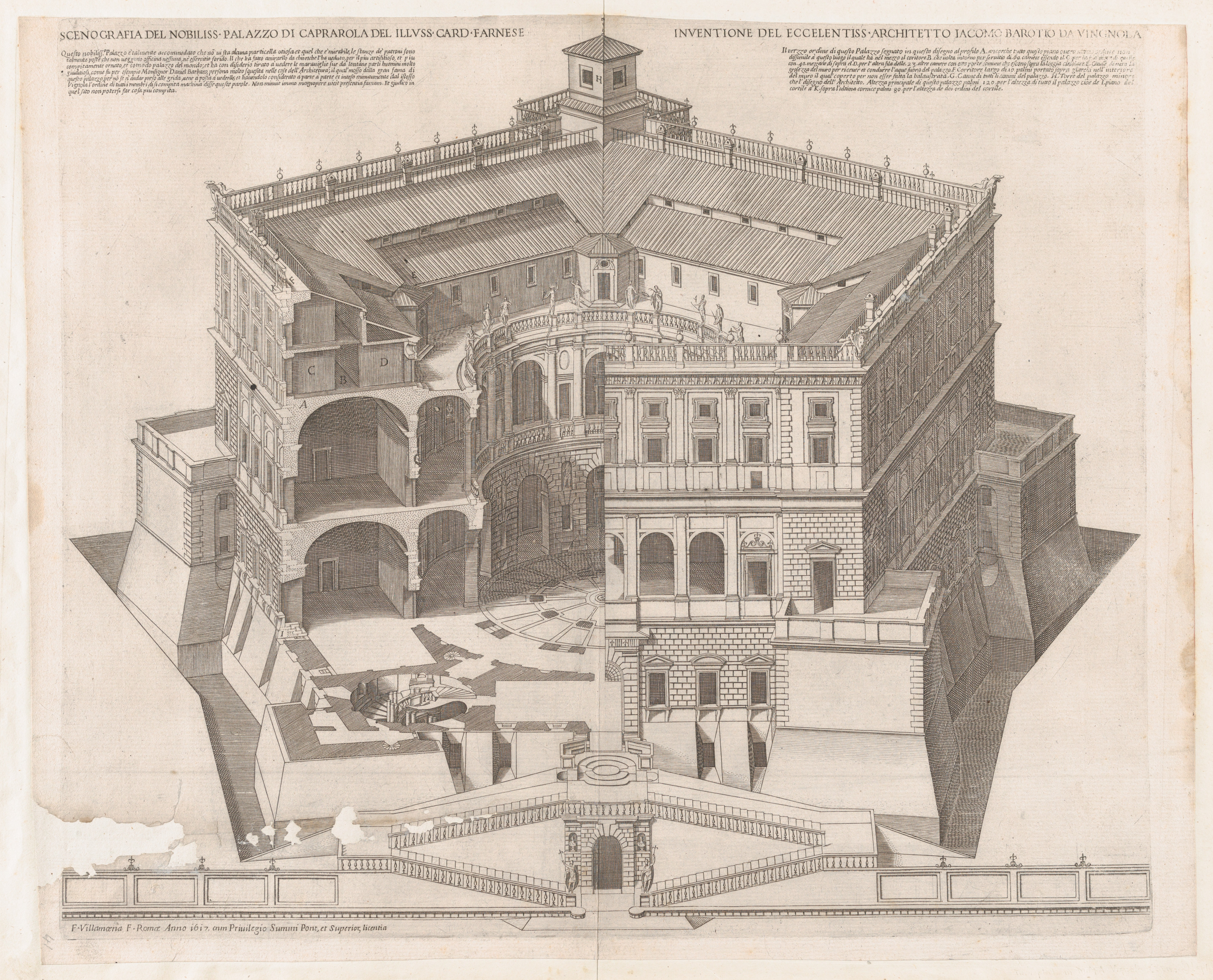
Palazzo Farnese, printed by Villamena for the Speculum Romanae Magnificentiae, Metropolitan Museum of Art, New York
