= Cirò, Calabria =

Cirò
- Comune
- Comune di Cirò
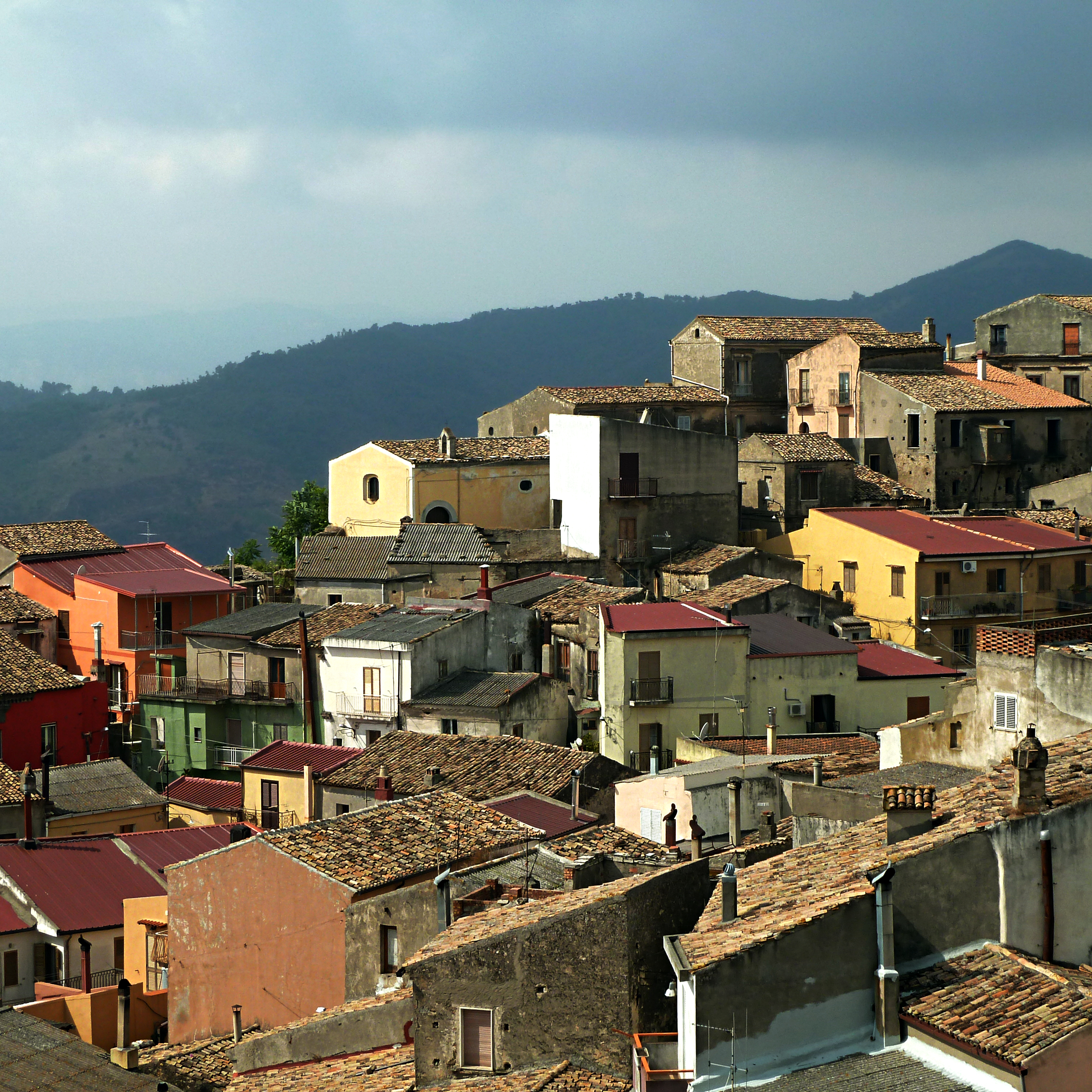

- Location within Italy Location within Calabria
- Coordinates: 39°22′50″N 17°03′50″E
- Country: Italy
- Region: Calabria
- Province: Crotone (KR)
- Frazioni: L'Attiva, La Cappella, Santa Venere

Government
  - Mayor: Mario Caruso

Area
  - Total: 70 km^{2} (27 sq mi)
- Elevation: 351 m (1,152 ft)

Population (May, 2011)
  - Total: 3,209
  - Density: 46/km^{2} (120/sq mi)
- Demonym: Cirotani
- Time zone: UTC+1 (CET)
  - Summer (DST): UTC+2 (CEST)
- Postal code: 88813
- Dialing code: 0962
- Patron saint: San Francesco di Paola & San Nicodemo
- Saint day: April 2

Cirò is a comune and town with a population of 3614 people in the province of Crotone, in Calabria, Italy.

== History ==
There were Bronze Age settlements in the area and fossils have been found and are preserved for eventual exhibition in a museum to be established. The ancient Greeks had a settlement on the sea coast - rudiments of a shrine to Apollo have been found. The town on the hill had its origins before 1000 AD but it was greatly expanded after the Saracens started raiding the sea coast. Cirò (known earlier as Psicro) became an important regional center with a castle most of which was constructed between the years 1300 and 1500. Today the castle is in a rather bad shape and should be restored. The administration is attempting to obtain funds and authorisation to do so. Until around 1970 the regional court had its seat in Cirò. After the coastal town split off, much of the administrative functions were transferred there.

== Economy ==
Cirò relies on the production of oil, wine, cereals, citruses and intense breeding of cattle.

The town of Cirò is famous for the production of Calabria's most important wine of the same name. The ancient Greeks started producing this wine under a different name nearly 3000 years ago and it was also offered to victors of the ancient Olympics.

== Notable people ==
- Luigi Lilio (creator of the Gregorian Calendar)
- Nicodemo Gentile (lawyer and TV personality)

== See also ==
- Cirò wine
