= Nicodemo Gentile =

Italian lawyer and television personality

- Born: 24 June 1969 (age 56); Cirò, Italy
- Occupations: Lawyer, writer and television personality

Nicodemo Gentile (born 24 June 1969) is an Italian lawyer, writer and TV personality. He started his career defending the poor and street people in Perugia. From 2020, he is president of Penelope Association. In 2023 he was confirmed in this charge.

== Biography ==
Born in Cirò (Calabria) on 1969, Gentile graduated in Law and moved to Perugia, where today is part of the Perugia Lawyers. His specialization is to be criminal lawyer. He is expert in immigration right.

His career has always been committed to the families of murder victims and missing persons. He is known throughout Italy and is the member of the Penelope Association, founded in 2002, that take in charge problems of women victims of male violence. From 2020, he is president of this Association.

From a few years he has always present on TV, guest on programs such as Chi l'ha visto? and Quarto grado and gives voice to the families of missing people.

== Publications ==
- Calabretta Cataldo, Gentile Nicodemo (2014). Questo non è che l'inizio. Giulio Perrone Editore. ISBN 978-8860043498.
- Gentile, Nicodemo (2017). Laggiù tra il ferro – Storie di vita, storie di reclusi. Imprimatur.
- Gentile, Nicodemo (2018). Nella terra del niente. Storie di scomparse, storie di famiglie. Edizioni Faust. ISBN 978-8898147809.
- Gentile, Nicodemo (2019). Il padrone. Storia di una manipolazione, storia di una tragedia. Edizioni Faust.
- Gentile, Nicodemo (2021). Nulla è come appare. Storie di delitti, storie di accertamenti tecnici. Edizioni Faust. ISBN 979-1280029089.
