= Concurrency =

Concurrent means happening at the same time. Concurrency, concurrent, or concurrence may refer to:

== Law ==
- Concurrence, in jurisprudence, the need to prove both actus reus and mens rea
- Concurring opinion (also called a "concurrence"), a legal opinion which supports the conclusion, though not always the reasoning, of the majority.
- Concurrent estate, a concept in property law
- Concurrent resolution, a legislative measure passed by both chambers of the United States Congress
- Concurrent sentences, in criminal law, periods of imprisonment that are served simultaneously

== Computing ==
- Concurrency (computer science), the property of program, algorithm, or problem decomposition into order-independent or partially-ordered units
- Concurrent computing, the overlapping execution of multiple interacting computational tasks
- Concurrence (quantum computing), a measure used in quantum information theory
- Concurrent Computer Corporation, an American computer systems manufacturer
- Concurrent DOS, Digital Research's multiuser multitasking operating system, with "Concurrent" once being their registered trademark
- Concurrence, a presentation program designed by Lighthouse Design for NeXTSTEP which inspired Keynote by Apple

== Engineering ==
- Concurrent engineering, an engineering methodology emphasizing the parallelisation of tasks
- Concurrent Design Facility, an assessment center of the European Space Agency using concurrent engineering methods

== Other ==
- Concurrent lines, in geometry, multiple lines or curves intersecting at a single point
- Concurrency (road), an instance of one physical road bearing two or more different route numbers
- Concurrent (Easter), the weekday of 24 March Julian used to calculate Julian Easter
- Concurrent enrolment, a process in the US allowing students to enroll at a university or college while still in high school
