= Lilian date =

Calendar date format

A Lilian date is a day numbering system that counts the number of days elapsed since 15 October 1582, the first day of the Gregorian calendar, which is designated as Lilian date 1. The system was introduced in 1986 by Bruce G. Ohms, an engineer at IBM, to simplify date calculations in computing environments.

Named after Aloysius Lilius, the principal author of the Gregorian Calendar reform, the Lilian date represents calendar dates as continuous integers rather than as year–month–day components. It is currently used by date conversion routines that are part of IBM Language Environment (LE) software and in IBM AIX COBOL.

Lilius’s reform addressed accumulated drift in the Julian calendar and was promulgated by Pope Gregory XIII. In the first countries to implement the reform, Thursday 4 October 1582 (Julian) was followed by Friday 15 October 1582 (Gregorian). The Lilian epoch aligns with this first Gregorian day.

== Definition ==
The Lilian date represents a calendar day as a single integer: 1 corresponds to 15 October 1582 (Gregorian), 2 to 16 October 1582, and so on, increasing by one each day. IBM documentation describes 14 October 1582 as day 0 for internal calculations, while public interfaces typically accept and produce values greater than or equal to 1, corresponding to dates from 15 October 1582 onward. Implementations commonly support dates through 31 December 9999. T

The system is intended solely for date arithmetic (adding/subtracting days, computing intervals) and deliberately excludes fractions of a day or references to time standards.

== Relation to other day counts ==
The Lilian date is only a date format: it is not tied to any particular time standard. Another, better known, date notation that is used for similar purposes is the Julian date, which is tied to Universal time (or some other closely related time scale, such as International Atomic Time). The Julian date always begins at noon, Universal Time, and a decimal fraction may be used to represent the time of day. In contrast, Ohms did not make any mention of time zones or time of day in his paper.

If the Lilian date was to be reckoned in Universal Time, and if the Lilian date is taken to begin at midnight, the Lilian date can be obtained from the Julian date by subtracting 2,299,159.5 from the Julian date, and ignoring the decimal fraction in the result.

== See also ==
- Rata Die
