= Calendrical calculation =

Calculations related to calendar dates

A calendrical calculation is a calculation concerning calendar dates. Calendrical calculations can be considered an area of applied mathematics. Some examples of calendrical calculations:

- Converting a Julian or Gregorian calendar date to its Julian day number and vice versa.
- The number of days between two dates, which is simply the difference in their Julian day numbers.
- The dates of moveable holidays, like Christian Easter (the calculation is known as Computus) followed up by Ascension Thursday and Pentecost or Advent Sundays, or the Jewish Passover, for a given year.
- Converting a date between different calendars. For instance, dates in the Gregorian calendar can be converted to dates in the Islamic calendar with the Kuwaiti algorithm.
- Calculating the day of the week.

Calendrical calculation is one of the five major Savant syndrome characteristics.

== Examples ==
Numerical methods were described in the Journal of the Department of Mathematics, Open University, Milton Keynes, Buckinghamshire (M500) in 1997 and 1998. The following algorithm gives the number of days (d) in month m of year y. The value of m is given on the right of the month in the following list:

January 11 February 12 March 1 April 2 May 3 June 4 July 5 August 6 September 7 October 8 November 9 December 10.

The algorithm enables a computer to print calendar and diary pages for past or future sequences of any desired length from the reform of the calendar, which in England was 3/14 September 1752. The article Date of Easter gives algorithms for calculating the date of Easter. Combining the two enables the page headers to show any fixed or movable festival observed on the day, and whether it is a bank holiday.

The algorithm utilises the integral or floor function: thus $\left\lfloor{x}\right\rfloor$ is that part of the number x which lies to the left of the decimal point. It is only necessary to work through the complete function when calculating the length of February in a year which is divisible by 100 without remainder. When calculating the length of February in any other year it is only necessary to evaluate the terms to the left of the fifth + sign. When calculating the length of any other month it is only necessary to evaluate the terms to the left of the third - sign.

$d=30+\left\lfloor{0.6m+0.4}\right\rfloor-\left\lfloor{0.6m-0.2}\right\rfloor-2\left\lfloor{m/12}\right\rfloor+\left\lfloor{m/12}\right\rfloor\left\lfloor{\frac{y-1}{4}-\left\lfloor{\frac{y-1}{4}}\right\rfloor+0.25}\right\rfloor$

$$+\left\lfloor{m/12}\right\rfloor\left\lfloor{\left\lfloor{\cfrac{\left\lfloor{0.3+\cfrac{\left\lfloor{y/100}\right\rfloor-3}{4.5}-\left\lfloor{\cfrac{\left\lfloor{y/100}\right\rfloor-3}{4.5}}\right\rfloor}\right\rfloor+99+100\left\lfloor{y/100-\left\lfloor{y/100}\right\rfloor}\right\rfloor}{100}}\right\rfloor-1}\right\rfloor$$

To find the length of, for example, February 2000 the calculation is

$$d=30+\left\lfloor{7.2+0.4}\right\rfloor-\left\lfloor{7.2-0.2}\right\rfloor-2+\left\lfloor{1999/4-\left\lfloor{1999/4}\right\rfloor+0.25}\right\rfloor$$

$+\left\lfloor{\cfrac{\left\lfloor{0.3+\cfrac{20-3}{4.5}-\left\lfloor{\cfrac{20-3}{4.5}}\right\rfloor}\right\rfloor+99}{100}}\right\rfloor-1$

$=30+7-7-2+\left\lfloor{499.75-499+0.25}\right\rfloor+\left\lfloor{\frac{\left\lfloor{0.3+3.77-3}\right\rfloor+99}{100}}\right\rfloor-1$

$=28+1+1-1$

$=29.$

== See also ==
Calendrical Calculations
