= Benedict Pereira =

Spanish theologian and philosopher (1536–1610)

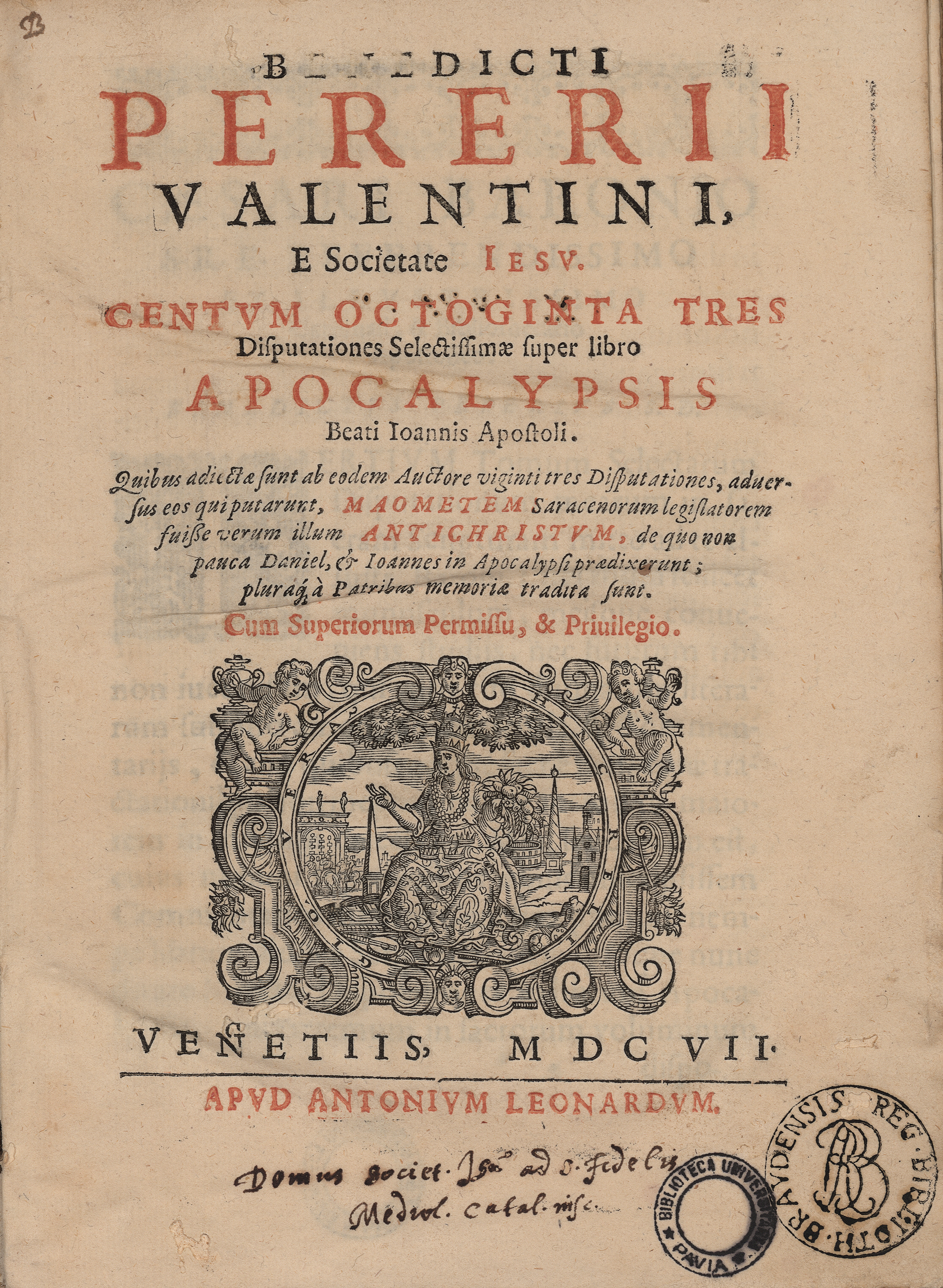
Centum octoginta tres disputationes

Benedict Pereira (also Pereyra, Benet Perera, Benet Pererius) (March 4, 1536 – 6 March 1610) was a Spanish Jesuit philosopher, theologian, and exegete.

== Life ==
Pereira was born at Ruzafa, near Valencia, in Spain. He entered the Society of Jesus in 1552 and taught successively literature, philosophy, theology, and sacred scripture in Rome, where he died.

== Works ==
He published eight works, and left a vast deal of manuscript. (Sommervogel, infra, mentions twelve sets.)

His main philosophical work is De communibus omnium rerum naturalium principiis et affectionibus libri quindecim (Rome, 1576).

The main difficulties of the Book of Genesis are met in Commentariorum et disputationum in Genesim tomi quattuor (Rome, 1591–1599). This is a mine of information in regard to the Deluge, Noah's Ark, the Tower of Babel, etc., and was highly rated by Richard Simon (Histoire critique du Vieux Testament, III, xii).

The Commentariorum in Danielem prophetam libri sexdecim (Rome, 1587) are much less diffuse.

Other writings published by Pereira were:

- 137 exegetical dissertations in five volumes on "Exodus" (Ingolstadt, 1601)
- 188 dissertations on "The Epistle to the Romans" (Ingolstadt, 1603);
- 183 dissertations on "The Apocalypse"
- 214 dissertations on "The Gospel of St. John", chapters 1 through 9 (Lyons, 1608)
- 144 dissertations on "The Gospel of St. John", chapters 10 through 14 (Lyons, 1610)

To the fourth volume of the dissertations is appended a work of twenty-three dissertations to show that Mohammed was not the Antichrist, of the Apocalypse and of Daniel.

== Debate against Clavius ==
Pereira was an outspoken opponent of Christopher Clavius at the Collegio Romano. The debate concerned the nature of mathematics. Pereira argued that mathematical demonstrations point to complex relations between numbers, lines, figures, etc., but lack the logical force of a demonstration from true causes or the essence of things. Furthermore, mathematics does not have a true subject matter; it merely draws connections between different properties (Alexander, p. 69). Clavius responded in "Prolegomena" that the subject of mathematics is matter itself, since all mathematics is "immersed" in matter. The debate had broad ramifications with regard to inclusion of mathematics as a basic subject in the Jesuit curriculum.

== Bibliography ==
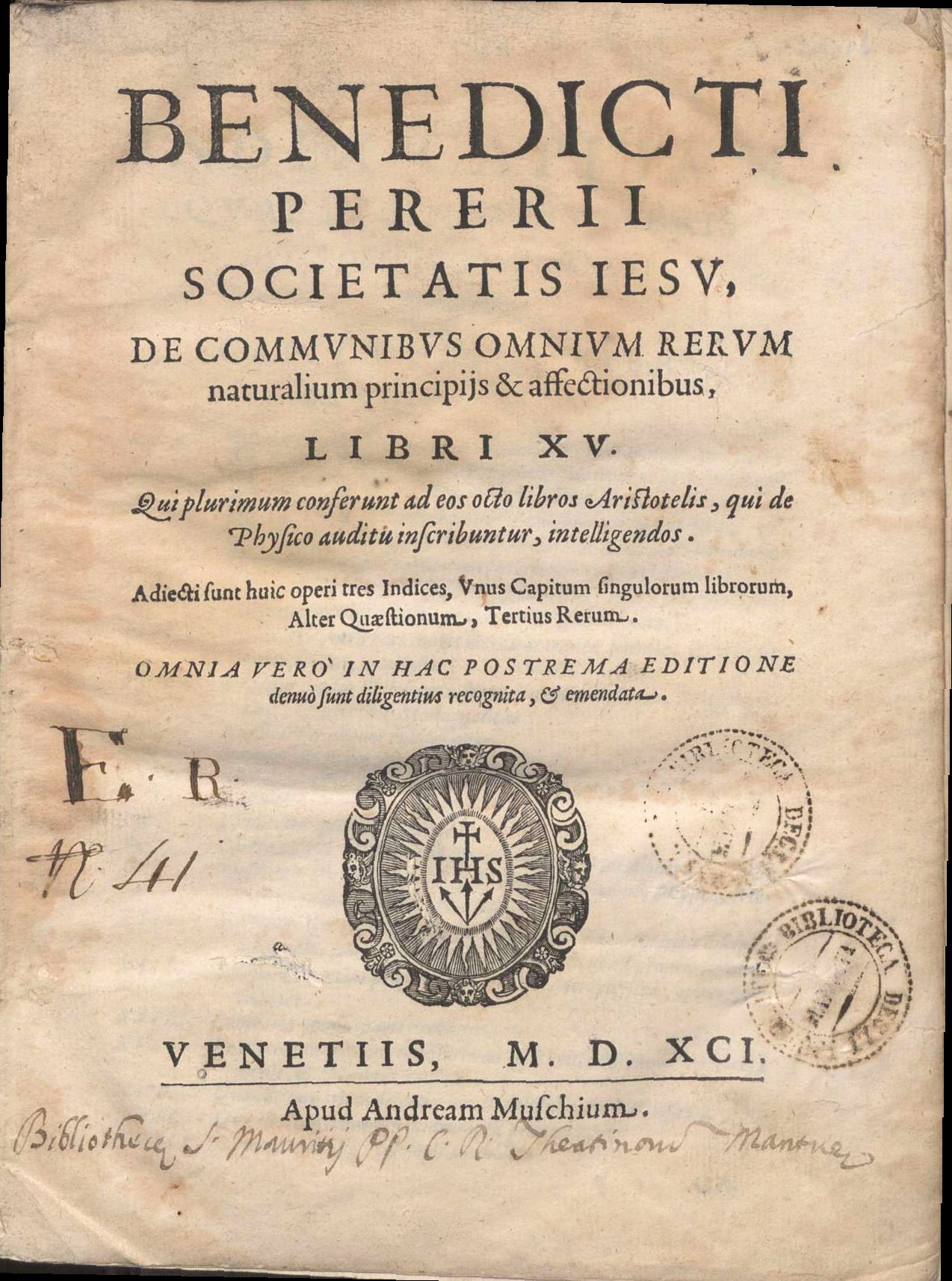
De communibus omnium rerum naturalium principijs et affectionibus, 1591

Works

- Benedicti Pererii... De communibus omnium rerum naturalium principijs et affectionibus, libri quindecim : qui plurimum conferunt ad eos octo libros Aristotelis, qui De physico auditu inscribuntur intelligendos... Venetiis: apud Andream Muschium. 1591.
- Benedicti Pererij... Tertius tomus Commentariorum in Genesim. Super historia centum annorum, quam de sanctissimo patriarcha Abraham scripsit Moses, à capite duodecimo, vsque ad vigesimum quintum. Continet hic tertius tomus, praeter copiosam verborum et sententiarum Mosis expositionem, amplius nonaginta principales disputationes, ad exactiorem atque vberiorem eiusdem historiae tractatum & cognitionem pertinentes. Romae: ex Typographia vaticana. 1595.
- Benedicti Pererij Valentini, e' Societate Iesu, Quartus tomus selectarum disputationum in sacram Scripturam: qui est prior tomus disputationum in Euangelium B. Ioannis super nouem primis eius Euangelij capitibus, ducentas & quatuordecim disputationes continens. Lugduni: sumptibus Horatij Cardon. 1608.
- Benedicti Pererij Valentini, e' Societate Iesu, Quintus tomus selectarum disputationum in sacram Scripturam: qui est secundus tomus disputationum in Euangelium B. Ioannis, continens centum quadraginta quatuor disputationes. Lugduni: sumptibus Horatij Cardon. 1610.
- Benedicti Pererij Valentini e Societate Iesu. Centum octoginta tres disputationes selectissimae super libro Apocalypsis beati Ioannis Apostoli. Quibus adiectae sunt ab eodem auctore viginti tres disputationes, aduersus eos qui putarunt, Maometem Saracenorum legislatorem fuisse verum illum Antichristum. Venetijs: apud Antonium Leonardum. 1607.
- Elucidarium sacrae theologiae moralis et juris utriusque : exponens universum idioma, id est proprietatem sermonis theologici, canonici, & civilis ... authore ... Benedicto Pereyra. Venetiis: sumptibus Combi & Lanouii. 1678.
- Benedicti Pererii Valentini... Quartus tomus Commentariorum in librum Genesis. A capite vigesimo quinto vsque ad quinquagesimum, & finem libri. Hic porro quartus tomus, praeter copiosam verborum, & sententiarum Moysis expositionem, continet centum & vndecim principales disputationes. Romae: apud Aloysium Zannettum sumptibus Ioannis Antonij Franzini & haeredum Hieronymi Franzini. 1599.
- Benedicti Pererii Valentini e Societate Iesu... Prior tomus commentariorum & disputationum in Genesim: ... Romae: in aedibus Populi Romani. 1589.
- Benedicti Pererij… Commentariorum et disputationum in Genesim tomus secundus continens nouem libros circa historiam Mosis de diluuio, Arca Noe, aedificatione turris Babel; Confusione linguarum, alijsque vsque ad Vocationem Abrahae, id est, à capite quinto vsque ad duodecimum. Adiectus est praeterea huic tomo, liber eiusdem auctoris de benedictionibus duodecim Patriarcharum. Romae: ex Typographia Aloysij Zannetti. 1592.
- Benedicti Pererij Valentini, e Societate Iesu Secundus tomus selectarum disputationum in Sacram Scripturam, continens centum octoginta octo disputationes super Epistola beati Pauli ad Romanos. Ingolstadij: ex typographia Adami Sartorij. 1603.

Studies

- Constance Blackwell, The Vocabulary for Natural Philosophy. The “De primo cognito” Question - A preliminary Exploration: Zimara, Toletus, Pererius and Zabarella, in Lexiques et glossaires philosophiques de la Renaissance, Fédération Internationale des Instituts d’Etudes Médiévales, Louvain-la-neuve 2003 (Textes et études du Moyen Âge, 23), 287-308.
- Constance Blackwell, Thomas Aquinas against the Scotists and Platonists. The Definition of ens: Cajetano, Zimara, Pererio, Verbum Anaelecta Neolatina, 6/1 (2004), 179-188, in part. 185-188.
- Paul Richard Blum, "Cognitio falsitatis vera est". Benedictus Pererius critico della magia e della cabala, in Fabrizio Meroi and Elisabetta Scapparone (eds.): La magia nell'Europa moderna: tra antica sapienza e filosofia naturale: atti del convegno, Firenze, 2-4 ottobre 2003, Firenze: Olschki, 2007, 345-362.
- Paul Richard Blum, Benedictus Pererius: Renaissance Culture at the Origins of Jesuit Science, in Science & Education 15 (2006) 279-304.
- Paul Richard Blum, Studies on Early Modern Aristotelianism, Leiden: Brill, 2012 (Chapter Nine: Benedictus Pereirus: Renaissance Culture at the Origins of Jesuit Science, pp. 139–182).
- Marco Lamanna, "De eo enim metaphysicus agit logice". Un confronto tra Pererius e Goclenius, in Medioevo 34 (2009) 315-360.
- "Benet Perera (Pererius, 1535-1610). A Renaissance Jesuit at the Crossroads of Modernity", Quaestio. Journal for the History of Metaphysics, 14, 2014.
