= Aloysius Lilius =

Italian astronomer (c. 1510–1576)

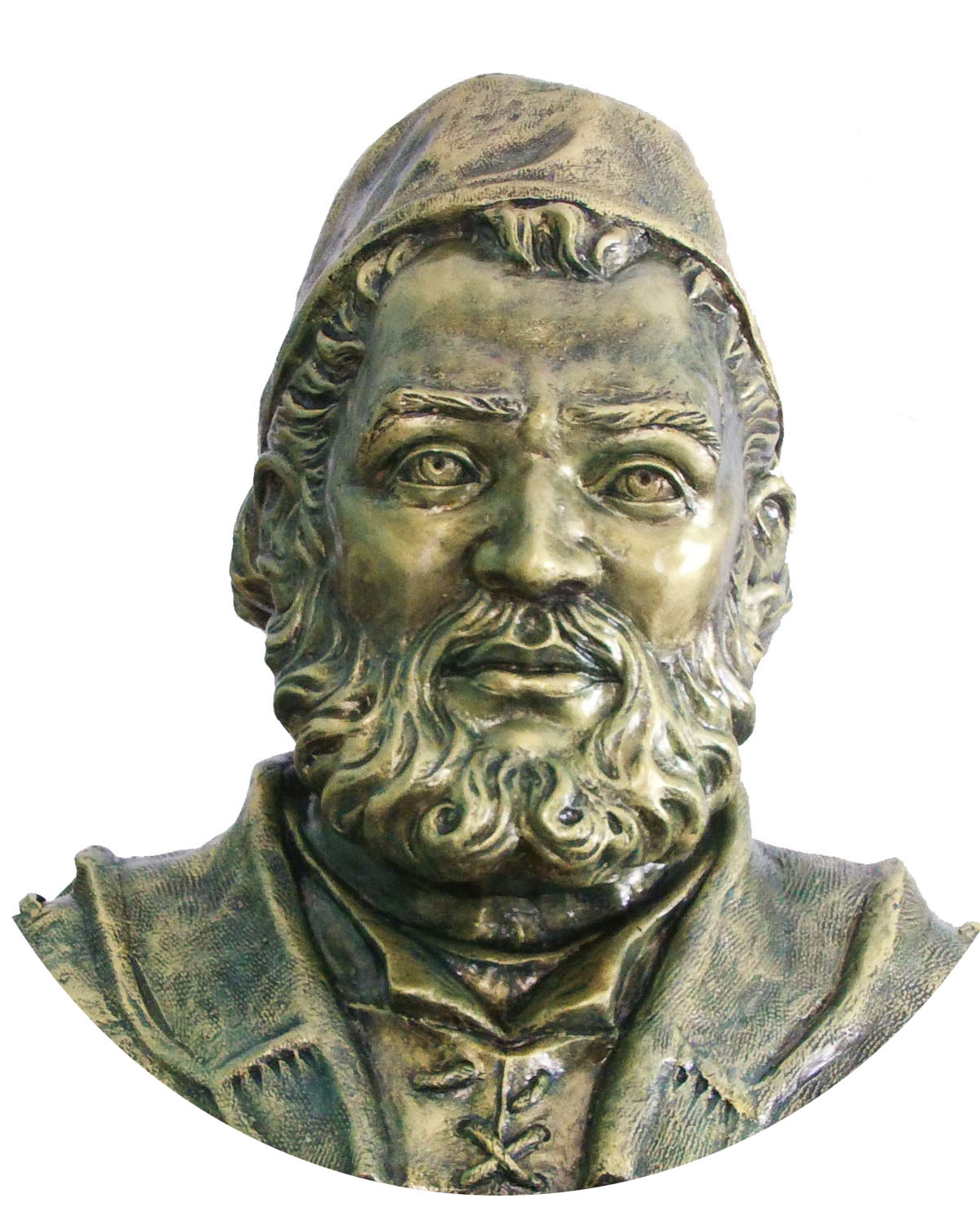
- Bust of Aloysius Lilius
- Born: c. 1510; Cirò, Calabria
- Died: 1576 (aged 65–66); Rome, Papal States
- Known for: Primary author of the Gregorian calendar
- Scientific career
- Fields: Mathematics, astronomy, medicine, chronology, philosophy

Aloysius Lilius (c. 1510 – 1576), also variously referred to as Luigi Lilio or Luigi Giglio, was an Italian physician, astronomer, philosopher and chronologist, and also the "primary author" who provided the proposal that (after modifications) became the basis of the Gregorian Calendar reform of 1582.

The crater Lilius on the Moon is named after him, as is the asteroid 2346 Lilio. In computer science, the Lilian date is the number of days since the adoption of the Gregorian calendar on 15 October 1582.

== Life and work ==
Not much is known about the early life of Lilius/Lilio/Giglio. It is known that he came from the comune of Cirò in the province of Crotone, in the Calabria region of Italy. He studied medicine and astronomy in Naples, after which he served Count Carafa. He settled in Verona and died in 1576. Although he was still alive at the time when his proposal was presented at Rome, it does not seem that he made the presentation; it was handled by his brother Antonio, also a physician and astronomer.

He is primarily known as the inventor of the Gregorian Calendar: he wrote the proposal on which (after modifications) the calendar reform was based. Lilio's brother Antonio presented the manuscript to Pope Gregory XIII; it was passed to the calendar reform commission in 1575. The commission issued a printed summary entitled Compendium novae rationis restituendi kalendarium (Compendium of a New Plan for the Restitution of the Calendar), printed in 1577 and circulated within the Roman Catholic world in early 1578 as a consultation document. Lilio's manuscript itself is not known to have survived; the printed Compendium is the nearest known source for the details it contained.

The processes of consultation and deliberation meant that the reform to the calendar did not occur until 1582, six years after the death of Luigi Lilio in 1576. The reform had by then received some modifications in points of detail by the reform commission, in which one of the leading members was Christopher Clavius, who afterwards wrote defences and an explanation of the reformed calendar, including an emphatic acknowledgement of Lilio's work, especially for his provision of a useful reform for the lunar cycle: "We owe much gratitude and praise to Luigi Giglio who contrived such an ingenious Cycle of Epacts which, inserted in the calendar, always shows the new moon and so can be easily adapted to any length of the year, if only at the right moments the due adjustment is applied." The papal bull (Inter gravissimas) was issued on 24 February 1582 (year 1581 in Florentine Easter-based reckoning), ordering Catholic clergy to adopt the new calendar, and exhorting all Catholic sovereigns to do the same.

The year 2010 was the 500th year since the Lilius' birth; several activities were organized by Italian astronomers in order to recognize the great work performed by him. In particular, in Torretta di Crucoli (Crotone, Italy), a new astronomical group was created and dedicated to Luigi Lilio.
