= Nachum Dershowitz =

Israeli computer scientist

- נחום דרשוביץ
- Known for: Dershowitz–Manna ordering
- Awards: Herbrand Award 2011
- Scientific career
- Fields: Term rewriting
- Thesis: The Evolution of Programs (1979)
- Doctoral advisor: Zohar Manna
- Website: http://www.cs.tau.ac.il/~nachumd/Homepage.html

Nachum Dershowitz (Hebrew: נחום דרשוביץ) is an Israeli computer scientist, known e.g. for the Dershowitz–Manna ordering and the multiset path ordering used to prove termination of term rewrite systems.

== Education and career ==
He obtained his B.Sc., summa cum laude, in 1974 in computer science and applied mathematics from Bar-Ilan University, and his Ph.D. in 1979 in Applied Mathematics from the Weizmann Institute of Science. From 1978, he worked at the Department of Computer Science of the University of Illinois at Urbana-Champaign, and was hired as a full professor of the Tel Aviv University (School of Computer Science) in 1998. He was a guest researcher at Weizmann Institute, INRIA, ENS Cachan, Microsoft Research, and the universities of Stanford, Paris, Jerusalem, Chicago, and Beijing. He received the Herbrand Award for Distinguished Contributions to Automatic Reasoning in 2011.

He has co-authored the standard text on calendar algorithms, Calendrical Calculations, with Edward Reingold. An implementation of the algorithm in Common Lisp is in the public domain, and is also distributed with the book.

== See also ==
- New Moon
- Lunisolar calendar

== Selected publications ==
- Nachum Dershowitz & Zohar Manna (1977). "The Evolution of Programs: A System for Automatic Program Modification" (PDF). Proc. POPL. pp. 144–154.
- Nachum Dershowitz and Zohar Manna (Aug 1979). "Proving Termination with Multiset Orderings" (PDF). Communications of the ACM. 22 (8): 465–476. doi:10.1145/359138.359142. S2CID 17906810.
- N. Dershowitz (Oct 1979). "Orderings for Term Rewriting Systems". Proc. 20th Symposium on Foundations of Computer Science (FOCS). pp. 123–131.
- N. Dershowitz (1981). "Termination of linear rewriting systems: Preliminary version". In Shimon Even; Oded Kariv (eds.). Proc. ICALP. LNCS. Vol. 115. Springer. pp. 448–458.
- N. Dershowitz (1982). "Orderings for Term-Rewriting Systems" (PDF). Theoret. Comput. Sci. 17 (3): 279–301. doi:10.1016/0304-3975(82)90026-3. S2CID 6070052.
- Dershowitz, N. (1985). "Termination" (PDF). In Jean-Pierre Jouannaud (ed.). Rewriting Techniques and Applications, 1st Int. Conf., RTA-85. LNCS. Vol. 202. Springer. pp. 180–224.
- Bachmair, L. and Dershowitz, N. and Hsiang, J. (Jun 1986). "Orderings for Equational Proofs". Proc. IEEE Symposium on Logic in Computer Science (LICS). Cambridge/MA. pp. 346–357.
- Bachmair, L. & Dershowitz, N. (1987). "Completion for Rewriting Modulo a Congruence". In Lescanne, Pierre (ed.). Rewriting Techniques and Applications, 2nd Int. Conf., RTA-87. LNCS. Vol. 256. Springer. pp. 192–203.
- Nachum Dershowitz (1987). "Termination of Rewriting" (PDF). J. Symbolic Comput. 3 (1–2): 69–116. doi:10.1016/s0747-7171(87)80022-6.
- N. Dershowitz & M. Okada (1988). "Proof-Theoretic Techniques for Term Rewriting Theory". Proc. 3rd IEEE Symp. on Logic in Computer Science (PDF). pp. 104–111.
- N. Dershowitz & G. Sivakumar (1988). "Solving Goals in Equational Languages". Proc. 1st Int. Workshop on Conditional Term Rewriting Systems. LNCS. Vol. 308. Springer. pp. 45–55.
- Dershowitz, Nachum, ed. (1989). Rewriting Techniques and Applications, 3rd Int. Conf., RTA-89. LNCS. Vol. 355. Springer.
- N. Dershowitz & J.-P. Jouannaud (1990). "Rewrite Systems". In Jan van Leeuwen (ed.). Formal Models and Semantics. Handbook of Theoretical Computer Science. Vol. B. Elsevier. pp. 243–320.
- N. Dershowitz & J.-P. Jouannaud (1991). "Notations for Rewriting". Bulletin of the European Association of Theoretical Computer Science. 43: 162–172.
- Dershowitz, N. and Jouannaud, J.-P. and Jan Willem Klop (1991). "Open Problems in Rewriting". In Ronald V. Book (ed.). Rewriting Techniques and Applications, 4th Int. Conf., RTA-91. LNCS. Vol. 488. Springer. pp. 445–456.
- Dershowitz, N. and Jouannaud, J.-P. and Klop, J.W. (1993). "More Problems in Rewriting". In Kirchner, Claude (ed.). Rewriting Techniques and Applications, 5th Int. Conf., RTA-93. LNCS. Vol. 690. Springer. pp. 468–487.
- Nachum Dershowitz (Apr 1993). "Trees, Ordinals and Termination". Proc. CAAP/TAPSOFT (PDF). LNCS. Vol. 668. Springer. pp. 243–250.
- Dershowitz, N. & Hoot, C. (1993). "Topics in Termination". In Kirchner, Claude (ed.). Rewriting Techniques and Applications, 5th Int. Conf., RTA-93. LNCS. Vol. 690. Springer. pp. 198–212.
- Dershowitz, N. (1997). "Innocuous Constructor-Sharing Combinations". In Comon, Hubert (ed.). Rewriting Techniques and Applications, 8th Int. Conf., RTA-97. LNCS. Vol. 1232. Springer. pp. 202–216.
- Dershowitz, Nachum and Reingold, Edward M., Calendrical Calculations, Cambridge University Press, ISBN 0521702380, 1997
- Dershowitz, N. & Treinen, R. (1998). "An On-line Problem Database". In Tobias Nipkow (ed.). Rewriting Techniques and Applications, 9th Int. Conf., RTA-98. LNCS. Vol. 1379. Springer. pp. 332–342.
- Dershowitz, N. & Mitra, S. (1999). "Jeopardy". In Narendran, Paliath & Rusinowitch, Michaël (eds.). Rewriting Techniques and Applications, 10th Int. Conf., RTA-99. LNCS. Vol. 1631. Springer. pp. 16–29.
- Nachum Dershowitz and David A. Plaisted (2001). "Rewriting (Chapter 9)". In Alan Robinson; Andrei Voronkov (eds.). Handbook of Automated Reasoning. MIT Press + Elsevier. pp. 535–610.
- Dershowitz, N. (2005). "Term Rewriting and Applications". In Giesl, J. (ed.). Term Rewriting and Applications, 16th Int. Conf., RTA-05. LNCS. Vol. 3467. Springer. pp. 376–393. ISBN 978-3-540-25596-3.
- Dershowitz, N. & Castedo Ellerman, E. (2005). "Leanest Quasi-orderings". In Giesl, J. (ed.). Term Rewriting and Applications, 16th Int. Conf., RTA-05. LNCS. Vol. 3467. Springer. pp. 32–45. ISBN 978-3-540-25596-3.
- Dershowitz, Nachum 2005. The Four Sons of Penrose, in Proceedings of the Eleventh Conference on Logic for Programming, Artificial Intelligence, and Reasoning (LPAR; Jamaica), G. Sutcliffe and A. Voronkov, eds., Lecture Notes in Computer Science, vol. 3835, Springer-Verlag, Berlin, pp. 125–138.
