= Concurrent (Easter) =

A concurrent was the weekday of 24 March in the Julian calendar counted from 1 to 7, regarding 1 as Sunday. It was used to calculate the Julian Easter during the Middle Ages. It was derived from the weekday of the first day of the Alexandrian calendar during the 4th century, 1 Thoth (29–30 August), counting Wednesday as 1 (see Planetary hours#History). Therefore, the following 5 Thoth was a Sunday and the following 28 Phamenoth (24 March Julian) [= 208 Thoth ≡ 5 Thoth mod 7] was also a Sunday. It was first mentioned by Dionysius Exiguus in 525 in his Latin version of the original Alexandrian Church's Greek computus. The insertion of the sixth epagomenal day (29 August Julian) immediately before 1 Thoth was compensated for by the bissextile day (24 February Julian) inserted six months later into the Julian calendar.

The widely used post-Bedan solar cycle (first year 776), which repeats every 28 years, had concurrents of

1 2 3 4 6 7 1
2 4 5 6 7 2 3
4 5 7 1 2 3 5
6 7 1 3 4 5 6.

It skips a concurrent every four years due to a bissextile day in the Julian calendar a month earlier. The Sunday after the next Luna 14 was Easter Sunday (see Computus#Julian calendar). The concurrent is not used by the Gregorian Easter.
