= Zohar Manna =

American-Israeli computer scientist (1939–2018)

- זהר מנה
- Born: 1939; Haifa, Mandatory Palestine
- Died: August 30, 2018 (aged 78–79)
- Education: Technion – Israel Institute of Technology (BS, MS); Carnegie Mellon University (PhD)
- Spouse: Nitza
- Children: 4
- Awards: Fellow of the Association for Computing Machinery; Herbrand Award; Bauer Prize, Technical University of Munich; Honorary PhD, École Normale Supérieure de Cachan
- Scientific career
- Fields: Computer science
- Institutions: Weizmann Institute of Science; Stanford University
- Doctoral students: Nachum Dershowitz, Adi Shamir, Thomas Henzinger, Pierre Wolper, Martín Abadi
- Website: theory.stanford.edu/~zm

Zohar Manna (Hebrew: זהר מנה; 1939 – 30 August 2018) was an Israeli-American computer scientist who was a professor of computer science at Stanford University.

== Biography ==
He was born in Haifa, Mandatory Palestine in 1939. He earned his Bachelor of Science (BS) and Master of Science (MS) degrees from the Technion – Israel Institute of Technology.

He attended Carnegie Mellon University and earned his Doctor of Philosophy (PhD) in computer science in 1968.

Manna returned to Israel in 1972 as a professor of applied mathematics at the Weizmann Institute of Science. He became a full professor at Stanford in 1978. He remained affiliated with the Weizmann Institute of Science until 1995. He continued to work as a Stanford professor until retirement in 2010.

== Books ==
He authored nine books. The Mathematical Theory of Computation (McGraw Hill, 1974; reprinted Dover, 2003) is one of the first texts to provide extensive coverage of the mathematical concepts behind computer programming.

With Amir Pnueli, he co-authored an unfinished trilogy of textbooks on temporal logic and verification of reactive systems: The Temporal Logic of Reactive and Concurrent Systems: Specification (Springer-Verlag, 1991), The Temporal Logic of Reactive and Concurrent Systems: Safety (Springer-Verlag, 1995) and The Temporal Logic of Reactive and Concurrent Systems: Progress (unpublished; first three chapters posted at http://theory.stanford.edu/~zm/tvors3.html).

With Aaron R. Bradley he co-authored a textbook, The Calculus of Computation, that serves as an introduction to both first-order logic and formal verification.

== Awards ==
In 1994, he was inducted as a Fellow of the Association for Computing Machinery. In 2016, he shared the Herbrand Award with Richard Waldinger for his ″pioneering research and pedagogical contributions (with Richard Waldinger) to automated reasoning, program synthesis, planning, and formal methods″. He received the Bauer Prize from the Technical University of Munich, and an honorary doctorate from the École Normale Supérieure de Cachan.

== Advising ==
He supervised 30 doctoral students, including Nachum Dershowitz, Adi Shamir, Thomas Henzinger, Pierre Wolper, and Martín Abadi.

== See also ==
- Temporal logic
- Reactive systems
- Concurrency (computer science)
