= Ternary equivalence relation =

Ternary relation analogous to a binary equivalence relation

In mathematics, a ternary equivalence relation is a kind of ternary relation analogous to a binary equivalence relation. A ternary equivalence relation is symmetric, reflexive, and transitive, where those terms are meant in the sense defined below. The classic example is the relation of collinearity among three points in Euclidean space. In an abstract set, a ternary equivalence relation determines a collection of equivalence classes or pencils that form a linear space in the sense of incidence geometry. In the same way, a binary equivalence relation on a set determines a partition.

== Definition ==
A ternary equivalence relation on a set X is a relation E ⊂ X^{3}, written [a, b, c], that satisfies the following axioms:

1. Symmetry: If [a, b, c] then [b, c, a] and [c, b, a]. (Therefore also [a, c, b], [b, a, c], and [c, a, b].)
2. Reflexivity: [a, b, b]. Equivalently, in the presence of symmetry, if a, b, and c are not all distinct, then [a, b, c].
3. Transitivity: If a ≠ b and [a, b, c] and [a, b, d] then [b, c, d]. (Therefore also [a, c, d].)
