= Counting argument =

Counting argument may refer to:

- Pigeonhole principle
- Combinatorial proof
