= Dobiński's formula =

In combinatorial mathematics, Dobiński's formula states that the $n$th Bell number $B_n$, the number of partitions of a set of size $n$, equals

$$B_n = {1 \over e}\sum_{k=0}^\infty \frac{k^n}{k!},$$

where $e$ denotes Euler's number. The formula is named after G. Dobiński, who published it in 1877.

== Probabilistic content ==
In the setting of probability theory, Dobiński's formula represents the $n$th moment of the Poisson distribution with mean 1. Sometimes Dobiński's formula is stated as saying that the number of partitions of a set of size $n$ equals the $n$th moment of that distribution.

== Reduced formula ==
The computation of the sum of Dobiński's series can be reduced to a finite sum of $n+o(n)$ terms, taking into account the information that $B_n$ is an integer. Precisely one has, for any integer $K > 1$
$$B_n = \left\lceil {1 \over e}\sum_{k=0}^{K-1}\frac{k^n}{k!}\right\rceil$$
provided $\frac{K^n}{K!}\le 1$ (a condition that of course implies $K > n$, but that is satisfied by some $K$ of size $n+o(n)$). Indeed, since $K > n$, one has
$$\begin{align}
\displaystyle\Big(\frac{K+j}K\Big)^n &\le\Big(\frac{K+j}K\Big)^K=\Big(1+\frac jK\Big)^K \\
&\le \Big(1+\frac j1\Big)\Big(1+\frac j2\Big)\dots\Big(1+\frac jK\Big)\\
&=\frac{1+j}1 \frac{2+j}2 \dots  \frac{K+j}K\\
&=\frac{(K+j)!}{K!j!}.
\end{align}$$
Therefore $\frac{(K+j)^n}{(K+j)!}\le \frac{K^n}{K!}\frac 1{j!} \le \frac1{j!}$ for all $j \ge0$ so that the tail $\sum_{k\ge K} \frac{k^n}{k!}=\sum_{j\ge 0} \frac{(K+j)^n}{(K+j)!}$ is dominated by the series $\sum_{j\ge 0} \frac{1}{j!}=e$, which implies $0 < B_n - \frac1{e}\sum_{k=0}^{K-1}\frac{k^n}{k!}<1$, whence the reduced formula.

== Generalization ==
Dobiński's formula can be seen as a particular case, for $x=0$, of the more general relation:
$${1 \over e}\sum_{k=x}^\infty \frac{k^n}{(k-x)!} = \sum_{k=0}^n \binom{n}{k} B_{k} x^{n-k}$$

and for $x=1$ in this formula for Touchard polynomials

$$T_n(x) = e^{-x}\sum_{k=0}^\infty \frac{x^kk^n}{k!}$$

== Proof ==
One proof relies on a formula for the generating function for Bell numbers,

$$e^{e^x - 1} = \sum_{n = 0}^\infty \frac{B_n}{n!} x^n.$$

The power series for the exponential gives

$$e^{e^x} = \sum_{k = 0}^\infty \frac{e^{kx}}{k!} =
\sum_{k = 0}^\infty \frac{1}{k!} \sum_{n = 0}^\infty \frac{(kx)^n}{n!}$$

so

$$e^{e^x - 1} = \frac{1}{e} \sum_{k = 0}^\infty \frac{1}{k!} \sum_{n = 0}^\infty \frac{(kx)^n}{n!}$$

The coefficient of $x^n$ in this power series must be $B_n/n!$, so

$$B_n = \frac{1}{e} \sum_{k = 0}^\infty \frac{k^n}{k!}.$$

Another style of proof was given by Rota. Recall that if $x$ and $n$ are nonnegative integers then the number of one-to-one functions that map a size-$n$ set into a size-$x$ set is the falling factorial

$$(x)_n = x(x-1)(x-2)\cdots(x-n+1)$$

Let $f$ be any function from a size-$n$ set $A$ into a size-$x$ set $B$. For any $b\in B$, let $f^{-1}(b)=\{a\in A:f(a)=b\}$. Then $\{f^{-1}(b):b\in B\}$ is a partition of $A$. Rota calls this partition the "kernel" of the function $f$. Any function from $A$ into $B$ factors into

- one function that maps a member of $A$ to the element of the kernel to which it belongs, and
- another function, which is necessarily one-to-one, that maps the kernel into $B$.

The first of these two factors is completely determined by the partition $\pi$ that is the kernel. The number of one-to-one functions from $\pi$ into $B$ is $(x)_{|\pi|}$, where $|\pi|$ is the number of parts in the partition $\pi$. Thus the total number of functions from a size-$n$ set $A$ into a size-$x$ set $B$ is

$$\sum_\pi (x)_{|\pi|},$$

the index $\pi$ running through the set of all partitions of $A$. On the other hand, the number of functions from $A$ into $B$ is clearly $x^n$. Therefore, we have

$$x^n = \sum_\pi (x)_{|\pi|}.$$

Rota continues the proof using linear algebra, but it is enlightening to introduce a Poisson-distributed random variable $X$ with mean 1. The equation above implies that the $n$th moment of this random variable is

$$\mathbb{E}[X^n] = \sum_\pi \mathbb{E}[(X)_{|\pi|}]$$

where $\mathbb{E}$ stands for expected value. But we shall show that all the quantities $\mathbb{E}[(X)_k]$ equal 1. It follows that

$$\mathbb{E}[X^n] = \sum_\pi 1,$$

and this is just the number of partitions of the set $A$.

The quantity $\mathbb{E}[(X)_k]$ is called the $k$th factorial moment of the random variable $X$. To show that this equals 1 for all $k$ when $X$ is a Poisson-distributed random variable with mean 1, recall that this random variable assumes each value integer value $j \ge 0$ with probability $1/(ej!)$. Thus

$$\displaystyle\begin{align}
\mathbb{E}[(X)_k] &= \sum_{j = 0}^\infty  \frac{(j)_k}{ej!} \\
&= \frac{1}{e} \sum_{j = 0}^\infty \frac{j(j-1) \cdots (j-k+1)}{j(j-1) \cdots 1}\\
& = \frac{1}{e} \sum_{j = i}^\infty \frac{1}{(j-i)!} = 1.
\end{align}$$
