= Bijective proof =

Technique for proving sets have equal size

In combinatorics, bijective proof is a proof technique for proving that two sets have equally many elements, or that the sets in two combinatorial classes have equal size, by finding a bijective function that maps one set one-to-one onto the other. This technique can be useful as a way of finding a formula for the number of elements of certain sets, by corresponding them with other sets that are easier to count. Additionally, the nature of the bijection itself often provides powerful insights into each or both of the sets.

== Basic examples ==
=== Proving the symmetry of the binomial coefficients ===
The symmetry of the binomial coefficients states that

$${n \choose k} = {n \choose n-k}.$$

This means that there are exactly as many combinations of k things in a set of size n as there are combinations of n − k things in a set of size n.

The key idea of the bijective proof may be understood from a simple example: selecting k children to be rewarded with ice cream cones, out of a group of n children, has exactly the same effect as choosing instead the n − k children to be denied ice cream cones.

== Other examples ==
Problems that admit bijective proofs are not limited to binomial coefficient identities. As the complexity of the problem increases, a bijective proof can become very sophisticated. This technique is particularly useful in areas of discrete mathematics such as combinatorics, graph theory, and number theory.

The most classical examples of bijective proofs in combinatorics include:

- Prüfer sequence, giving a proof of Cayley's formula for the number of labeled trees.
- Robinson-Schensted algorithm, giving a proof of Burnside's formula for the symmetric group.
- Conjugation of Young diagrams, giving a proof of a classical result on the number of certain integer partitions.
- Bijective proofs of the pentagonal number theorem.
- Bijective proofs of the formula for the Catalan numbers.

== See also ==
- Binomial theorem
- Schröder–Bernstein theorem
- Double counting (proof technique)
- Combinatorial principles
- Combinatorial proof
- Categorification
