= Total relation =

Type of logical relation

In mathematics, a binary relation R ⊆ X×Y between two sets X and Y is total (or left total) if the source set X equals the domain {x : there is a y with xRy }. Conversely, R is called right total if Y equals the range {y : there is an x with xRy }.

When f: X → Y is a function, the domain of f is all of X, hence f is a total relation. On the other hand, if f is a partial function, then the domain may be a proper subset of X, in which case f is not a total relation.

"A binary relation is said to be total with respect to a universe of discourse just in case everything in that universe of discourse stands in that relation to something else."

== Algebraic characterization ==
Total relations can be characterized algebraically by equalities and inequalities involving compositions of relations. To this end, let $X,Y$ be two sets, and let $R\subseteq X\times Y.$ For any two sets $A,B,$ let $L_{A,B}=A\times B$ be the universal relation between $A$ and $B,$ and let $I_A=\{(a,a):a\in A\}$ be the identity relation on $A.$ We use the notation $R^\top$ for the converse relation of $R.$

- $R$ is total iff for any set $W$ and any $S\subseteq W\times X,$ $S\ne\emptyset$ implies $SR\ne\emptyset.$
- $R$ is total iff $I_X\subseteq RR^\top.$
- If $R$ is total, then $L_{X,Y}=RL_{Y,Y}.$ The converse is true if $Y\ne\emptyset.$ (Note: If $Y=\emptyset\ne X,$ then $R$ will be not total.)
- If $R$ is total, then $\overline{RL_{Y,Y}}=\emptyset.$ The converse is true if $Y\ne\emptyset.$ (Note: Observe $\overline{RL_{Y,Y}}=\emptyset\Leftrightarrow RL_{Y,Y}=L_{X,Y},$ and apply the previous bullet.)
- If $R$ is total, then $\overline R\subseteq R\overline{I_Y}.$ The converse is true if $Y\ne\emptyset.$
- More generally, if $R$ is total, then for any set $Z$ and any $S\subseteq Y\times Z,$ $\overline{RS}\subseteq R\overline S.$ The converse is true if $Y\ne\emptyset.$ (Note: Take $Z=Y,S=I_Y$ and appeal to the previous bullet.)

== See also ==
- Serial relation — a total homogeneous relation
