= Partition of a set =

Mathematical ways to group elements of a set

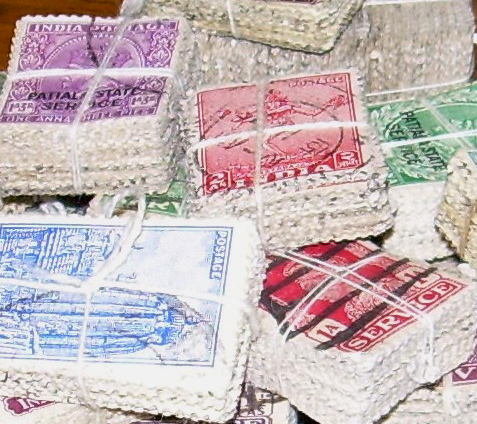
A set of stamps partitioned into bundles: No stamp is in two bundles, no bundle is empty, and every stamp is in a bundle.

The 52 partitions of a set with 5 elements. A colored region indicates a subset of X that forms a member of the enclosing partition. Uncolored dots indicate single-element subsets. The first shown partition contains five single-element subsets; the last partition contains one subset having five elements.

The traditional Japanese symbols for the 54 chapters of the Tale of Genji are based on the 52 ways of partitioning five elements (the two red symbols represent the same partition, and the green symbol is added for reaching 54).

In mathematics, a partition of a set is a grouping of its elements into non-empty subsets, in such a way that every element is included in exactly one subset.

Every equivalence relation on a set defines a partition of this set, and every partition defines an equivalence relation. A set equipped with an equivalence relation or a partition is sometimes called a setoid, typically in type theory and proof theory.

== Definition and notation ==
A partition of a set X is a set of non-empty subsets of X such that every element x in X is in exactly one of these subsets (i.e., the subsets are nonempty mutually disjoint sets).

Equivalently, a family of sets P is a partition of X if and only if all of the following conditions hold:

- The family P does not contain the empty set (that is $\emptyset \notin P$).
- The union of the sets in P is equal to X (that is $\textstyle\bigcup_{A\in P} A = X$). The sets in P are said to exhaust or cover X. See also collectively exhaustive events and cover (topology).
- The intersection of any two distinct sets in P is empty (that is $(\forall A,B \in P)\; A\neq B \implies A \cap B = \emptyset$). The elements of P are said to be pairwise disjoint or mutually exclusive. See also mutual exclusivity.

The sets in $P$ are called the blocks, parts, or cells, of the partition. If $a\in X$ then we represent the cell containing $a$ by $[a]$. That is to say, $[a]$ is notation for the cell in $P$ which contains $a$.

Every partition $P$ may be identified with an equivalence relation on $X$, namely the relation $\sim_{\!P}$ such that for any $a,b\in X$ we have $a\sim_{\!P} b$ if and only if $a\in [b]$ (equivalently, if and only if $b\in [a]$). The notation $\sim_{\!P}$ evokes the idea that the equivalence relation may be constructed from the partition. Conversely every equivalence relation may be identified with a partition. This is why it is sometimes said informally that "an equivalence relation is the same as a partition". If P is the partition identified with a given equivalence relation $\sim$, then some authors write $P = X/{\sim}$. This notation is suggestive of the idea that the partition is the set X divided into cells. The notation also evokes the idea that, from the equivalence relation one may construct the partition.

== Examples ==
- The empty set $\emptyset$ has exactly one partition, namely $\emptyset$. (Note: this is the partition, not a member of the partition.)
- For any non-empty set X, P = { X } is a partition of X, called the trivial partition.
  - Particularly, every singleton set {x} has exactly one partition, namely { {x} }.
- For any non-empty proper subset A of a set U, the set A together with its complement form a partition of U, namely, { A, U ∖ A }.
- The set {1, 2, 3} has these five partitions (one partition per item):
  - { {1}, {2}, {3} }, sometimes written 1 | 2 | 3.
  - { {1, 2}, {3} }, or 1 2 | 3.
  - { {1, 3}, {2} }, or 1 3 | 2.
  - { {1}, {2, 3} }, or 1 | 2 3.
  - { {1, 2, 3} }, or 1 2 3.
- The following are not partitions of {1, 2, 3}:
  - { {}, {1, 3}, {2} } is not a partition (of any set) because one of its elements is the empty set.
  - { {1, 2}, {2, 3} } is not a partition (of any set) because the element 2 is contained in more than one block.
  - { {1}, {2} } is not a partition of {1, 2, 3} because none of its blocks contains 3; however, it is a partition of {1, 2}.

== Partitions and equivalence relations ==
For any equivalence relation on a set X, the set of its equivalence classes is a partition of X. Conversely, from any partition P of X, we can define an equivalence relation on X by setting x ~ y precisely when x and y are in the same part in P. Thus the notions of equivalence relation and partition are essentially equivalent.

The axiom of choice guarantees for any partition of a set X the existence of a subset of X containing exactly one element from each part of the partition. This implies that given an equivalence relation on a set one can select a canonical representative element from every equivalence class.

== Refinement of partitions ==
Partitions of a 4-element set ordered by refinement

A partition α of a set X is a refinement of a partition ρ of X—and we say that α is finer than ρ and that ρ is coarser than α—if every element of α is a subset of some element of ρ. Informally, this means that α is a further fragmentation of ρ. In that case, it is written that α ≤ ρ.

This "finer-than" relation on the set of partitions of X is a partial order (so the notation "≤" is appropriate). Each set of elements has a least upper bound (their "join") and a greatest lower bound (their "meet"), so that it forms a lattice, and more specifically (for partitions of a finite set) it is a geometric and supersolvable lattice. The partition lattice of a 4-element set has 15 elements and is depicted in the Hasse diagram on the left.

The meet and join of partitions α and ρ are defined as follows. The meet $\alpha \wedge \rho$ is the partition whose blocks are the intersections of a block of α and a block of ρ, except for the empty set. In other words, a block of $\alpha \wedge \rho$ is the intersection of a block of α and a block of ρ that are not disjoint from each other. To define the join $\alpha \vee \rho$, form a relation on the blocks A of α and the blocks B of ρ by A ~ B if A and B are not disjoint. Then $\alpha \vee \rho$ is the partition in which each block C is the union of a family of blocks connected by this relation.

Based on the equivalence between geometric lattices and matroids, this lattice of partitions of a finite set corresponds to a matroid in which the base set of the matroid consists of the atoms of the lattice, namely, the partitions with $n-2$ singleton sets and one two-element set. These atomic partitions correspond one-for-one with the edges of a complete graph. The matroid closure of a set of atomic partitions is the finest common coarsening of them all; in graph-theoretic terms, it is the partition of the vertices of the complete graph into the connected components of the subgraph formed by the given set of edges. In this way, the lattice of partitions corresponds to the lattice of flats of the graphic matroid of the complete graph.

Another example illustrates refinement of partitions from the perspective of equivalence relations. If D is the set of cards in a standard 52-card deck, the same-color-as relation on D – which can be denoted ~_{C} – has two equivalence classes: the sets {red cards} and {black cards}. The 2-part partition corresponding to ~_{C} has a refinement that yields the same-suit-as relation ~_{S}, which has the four equivalence classes {spades}, {diamonds}, {hearts}, and {clubs}.

== Noncrossing partitions ==
A partition of the set N = {1, 2, ..., n} with corresponding equivalence relation ~ is noncrossing if it has the following property: If four elements a, b, c and d of N having a < b < c < d satisfy a ~ c and b ~ d, then a ~ b ~ c ~ d. The name comes from the following equivalent definition: Imagine the elements 1, 2, ..., n of N drawn as the n vertices of a regular n-gon (in counterclockwise order). A partition can then be visualized by drawing each block as a polygon (whose vertices are the elements of the block). The partition is then noncrossing if and only if these polygons do not intersect.

The lattice of noncrossing partitions of a finite set forms a subset of the lattice of all partitions, but not a sublattice, since the join operations of the two lattices do not agree.

The noncrossing partition lattice has taken on importance because of its role in free probability theory.

== Counting partitions ==
The total number of partitions of an n-element set is the Bell number B_{n}. The first several Bell numbers are B_{0} = 1, B_{1} = 1, B_{2} = 2, B_{3} = 5, B_{4} = 15, B_{5} = 52, and B_{6} = 203 (sequence A000110 in the OEIS). Bell numbers satisfy the recursion
$$B_{n+1}=\sum_{k=0}^n {n\choose k} B_k$$
and have the exponential generating function
$$\sum_{n=0}^\infty\frac{B_n}{n!}z^n=e^{e^z-1}.$$

Construction of the Bell triangle

The Bell numbers may also be computed using the Bell triangle in which the first value in each row is copied from the end of the previous row, and subsequent values are computed by adding two numbers, the number to the left and the number to the above left of the position. The Bell numbers are repeated along both sides of this triangle. The numbers within the triangle count partitions in which a given element is the largest singleton.

The number of partitions of an n-element set into exactly k (non-empty) parts is the Stirling number of the second kind S(n, k).

The number of noncrossing partitions of an n-element set is the Catalan number
$$C_n={1 \over n+1}{2n \choose n}.$$

== See also ==
- Exact cover
- Block design
- Cluster analysis
- List of partition topics
- Lamination (topology)
- MECE principle
- Partial equivalence relation
- Partition algebra
- Partition refinement
- Point-finite collection
- Rhyme schemes by set partition
- Weak ordering (ordered set partition)
