= Szekeres =

Szekeres is a Hungarian surname. Notable people with the surname include:

- Adrián Szekeres (born 1989), Hungarian professional football player
- Andy Szekeres, Australian multi-instrumentalist as a member of The Avalanches
- Béla Szekeres (disambiguation)
- Csaba Szekeres (born 1977), Hungarian road cyclist
- Cyndy Szekeres (1933–2024), American children's book author and illustrator
- Dorina Szekeres (born 1992), Hungarian swimmer
- Erzsébet Szekeres, 20th-century Hungarian disability rights activist
- Esther Szekeres (1910–2005), Hungarian-Australian mathematician, wife of George
- Ferenc Szekeres (born 1947), Hungarian long-distance runner and Olympian
- George Szekeres (1911–2005), Hungarian-Australian mathematician, husband of Esther
- Géza Szekeres (1873–1944), Hungarian stage actor, film actor, and theater director known as "Géza Steinhardt"
- Ildikó Szekeres (born 1973), Hungarian curler
- Ildikó Szekeres (swimmer) (born 1955), Hungarian swimmer
- Imre Szekeres (born 1950), Hungarian politician
- Jozef Szekeres (born 1970), Australian artist, animator, and toy designer
- Klára Szekeres (born 1987), Hungarian handballer
- László Szekeres (1921–2012), Hungarian medical professor
- Miklós Szekeres (1910–1972), British industrialist known as "Nicholas Sekers"
- Pál Szekeres (born 1964), Hungarian fencer, Olympian, and Paralympian
- Tamás Szekeres (born 1972), Hunagrian football player
- Tom Szekeres, British actor
- Zsolt Szekeres (born 1975), Hungarian football player

== See also ==
- Erdős–Szekeres theorem, mathematical assertion
- Eugene Szekeres Bagger (1892–?), Hungarian-American critic and writer
- George Szekeres Medal, award given by the Australian Mathematical society
- Klein-Erdos-Szekeres problem, mathematical conundrum better known as the "happy ending problem"
- Kruskal–Szekeres coordinates, coordinate system for the Schwarzchild geometry of a black hole
- Szekeres snark, snark with 50 vertices and 75 edges
- Szekeres-Wilf number, graph theory principle also known as the "coloring number" or "k-core number"
