= David Amess =

British politician (1952–2021)

Sir David Amess
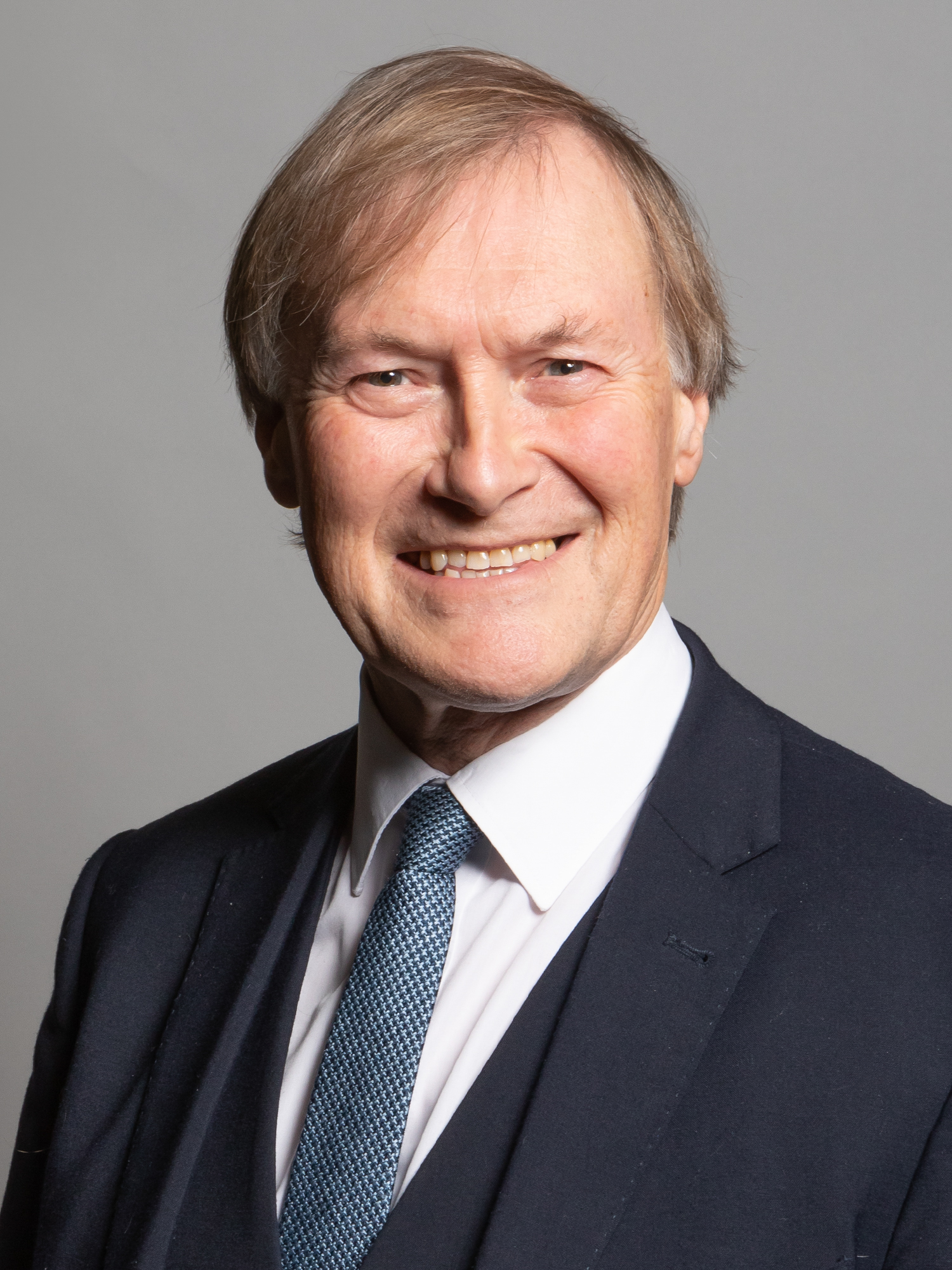
- Official portrait, 2020

Member of Parliament
- In office 9 June 1983 – 15 October 2021
- Preceded by: Harvey Proctor
- Succeeded by: Anna Firth
- Constituency: Basildon (1983–1997); Southend West (1997–2021)

Personal details
- Born: David Anthony Andrew Amess; 26 March 1952 Plaistow, Essex, England
- Died: 15 October 2021 (aged 69) Leigh-on-Sea, Essex, England
- Cause of death: Murder by stabbing
- Party: Conservative
- Spouse: Julia Arnold (m. 1983)
- Children: 5, including Katie
- Education: St Bonaventure's Grammar School
- Alma mater: Bournemouth University (BSc)
- Committees: Health (1998–2008); Panel of Chairs (2001–2021); Backbench Business (2010–2015); Administration (2015–2020)
- Awards: Knight Bachelor (2015)
- Website: Official website

Sir David Anthony Andrew Amess (/ˈeɪmɪs/ AY-miss; 26 March 1952 – 15 October 2021) was a British politician who served as a Member of Parliament (MP) for 38 years, serving Basildon from 1983 to 1997 and then Southend West until his murder in 2021. A member of the Conservative Party, he was a Catholic with socially conservative political views, and was in favour of Britain leaving the European Union.

Born and raised in Essex, Amess studied economics and government at Bournemouth University and then had short careers as a primary school teacher, underwriter and recruitment consultant. He was elected a Conservative councillor for Redbridge in 1982 and MP for Basildon at the 1983 general election. His position was seen as a bellwether seat, exemplifying the enthusiasm of the "Essex man" for the government of Margaret Thatcher. He held the seat in the election of 1992, but moved to the safer seat of Southend West at the 1997 general election and served the constituency as MP until his death.

In government, his highest position was as parliamentary private secretary to Michael Portillo for twelve years. He was more prominent as a backbencher, serving on many select committees and sponsoring several pieces of legislation, including the Protection against Cruel Tethering Act 1988 and the Warm Homes and Energy Conservation Act 2000. The causes for which he campaigned included animal welfare, awarding city status to Southend-on-Sea, the honouring of Raoul Wallenberg, and support for those suffering from endometriosis.

Amess was knighted in the 2015 New Year Honours for political and public service. On 15 October 2021, Amess was murdered at a constituency surgery in Leigh-on-Sea by Ali Harbi Ali, a British Islamic State terrorist. Southend was granted city status as a memorial to Amess in 2022.

== Early life and career ==
David Anthony Andrew Amess was born on 26 March 1952 in Plaistow, Essex (now part of Newham, London). From a working-class background, he was the son of James Amess, an electrician, and his wife Maud Martin, a dressmaker. Amess was raised Catholic, like his mother. Maud died on 12 October 2016 at the age of 104.

Amess attended St Anthony's Junior and Infant School, then St Bonaventure's Grammar School (now St Bonaventure's Catholic School) on Boleyn Road in Forest Gate. He said later in life that his political interests stemmed from his time at St Bonaventure's, where he stood for the Revolutionist Party, whose key demands were for minimum pocket money and the abolition of homework; by the time he became an adult, he was a Conservative. As a child he had a stammer, and speech therapy to correct this resulted in the loss of his natural Cockney accent. Amess went on to Bournemouth College of Technology (now Faculty of Science and Technology of Bournemouth University), where he earned a bachelor's degree (BSc Econ Hons 2:2) in economics and government. Amess taught disabled children at St John the Baptist Primary School in Bethnal Green for a year (1970–71), and then spent a short time as an underwriter (1974–76) before becoming a recruitment consultant.

== Political career ==
He unsuccessfully stood as the Conservative candidate for Newham North West in the 1977 Greater London Council election. He contested the safe Labour Party seat of Newham North West at the 1979 general election. The seat was retained by Labour's MP Arthur Lewis. In 1982, Amess was elected as a Conservative councillor to the London Borough of Redbridge's Mayfield ward, with his party forming the majority administration. He served as vice chairman of the Housing Committee from 1982 until 1985 and stood down for the 1986 local elections.

The incumbent Conservative MP for Basildon, Harvey Proctor, moved to Billericay in the 1983 general election; Amess was selected to replace him and was elected Member of Parliament for Basildon on 9 June 1983. He exemplified the new demographic of "Essex man" who supported Margaret Thatcher enthusiastically. Campaign described him as "representative of new Essex man, working class, father electrician, right wing, keen hanger, noisily rambunctious, no subtlety".

Amess continued serving as an MP and a local councillor until 1986, when he stood down from Redbridge Borough Council to concentrate on his Westminster seat. He held his Basildon seat narrowly at the 1987 general election, partly by developing a significant personal following. After the election, Amess was appointed a parliamentary private secretary to Michael Portillo, a position he held for ten years throughout Portillo's ministerial career. Amess held his seat again at the 1992 general election, which was the first sign that the Conservatives would unexpectedly win that election; the Basildon constituency was viewed as the make-or-break milestone.

Prior to the 1997 general election, there was a boundary review which divided the Basildon seat into two parts, which were added into two neighbouring seats. At the time, Amess remarked that the Boundary Commission "had raped the town of Basildon" by adding an extra seat there. Given his small majority, the new Basildon constituency was almost certainly going to be gained by Labour. Amess thus decided to seek re-election elsewhere. In June 1995, Amess was selected for Southend West after the retirement of former Cabinet minister Paul Channon. He was consequently returned to Westminster again in the 1997 general election. Angela Evans Smith won the newly-drawn Basildon seat for Labour in 1997 by over 13,000 votes.

=== Southend city status ===
Amess was known for being at the centre of a long-running campaign to make Southend-on-Sea, the main town of his constituency, a city. On 18 October 2021, it was announced that Queen Elizabeth II had agreed to grant Southend city status in his honour. On 1 March 2022, Charles, Prince of Wales, presented the letters patent on behalf of the Queen in the council chamber at Southend Civic Centre, officially granting the town city status.

=== Involvement in legislation ===
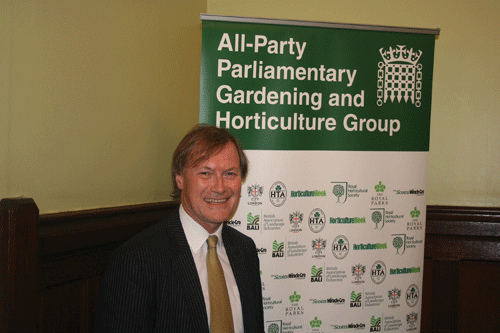
Amess in 2012, for Horticulture Week

Amess sponsored many bills in Parliament, including the Protection against Cruel Tethering Act 1988, and the Warm Homes and Energy Conservation Act 2000.

In 2014, he helped to pass the Security Printing (Specialist) Materials Bill. This bill ended a loophole which allowed companies who supplied specialist printing equipment to counterfeiters to evade prosecution.

In 2016, he helped to pass the Driving Instructors (Registration) Bill. This statute streamlined the process whereby instructors whose registration has lapsed can apply to return to the register. It also allowed instructors who wish to leave the register for personal reasons to do so without being penalised. Driving school owners and motoring organisations supported the bill.

==== Protection against Cruel Tethering Act 1988 ====
The Protection against Cruel Tethering Act came about as a result of Amess's long-standing concern for animal welfare, supported by the National Farmers' Union. Amess stated in the House of Commons that the Ten Minute Rule bill was "inspired by the Essex Horse and Pony Protection Society". The bill stated:

In section 1 of the Protection of Animals Act 1911 there shall be added in subsection (1) the following words after paragraph (e) "or (f) shall tether any horse, ass or mule under such conditions or in such manner as to cause that animal unnecessary suffering …

==== Warm Homes and Energy Conservation Act 2000 ====
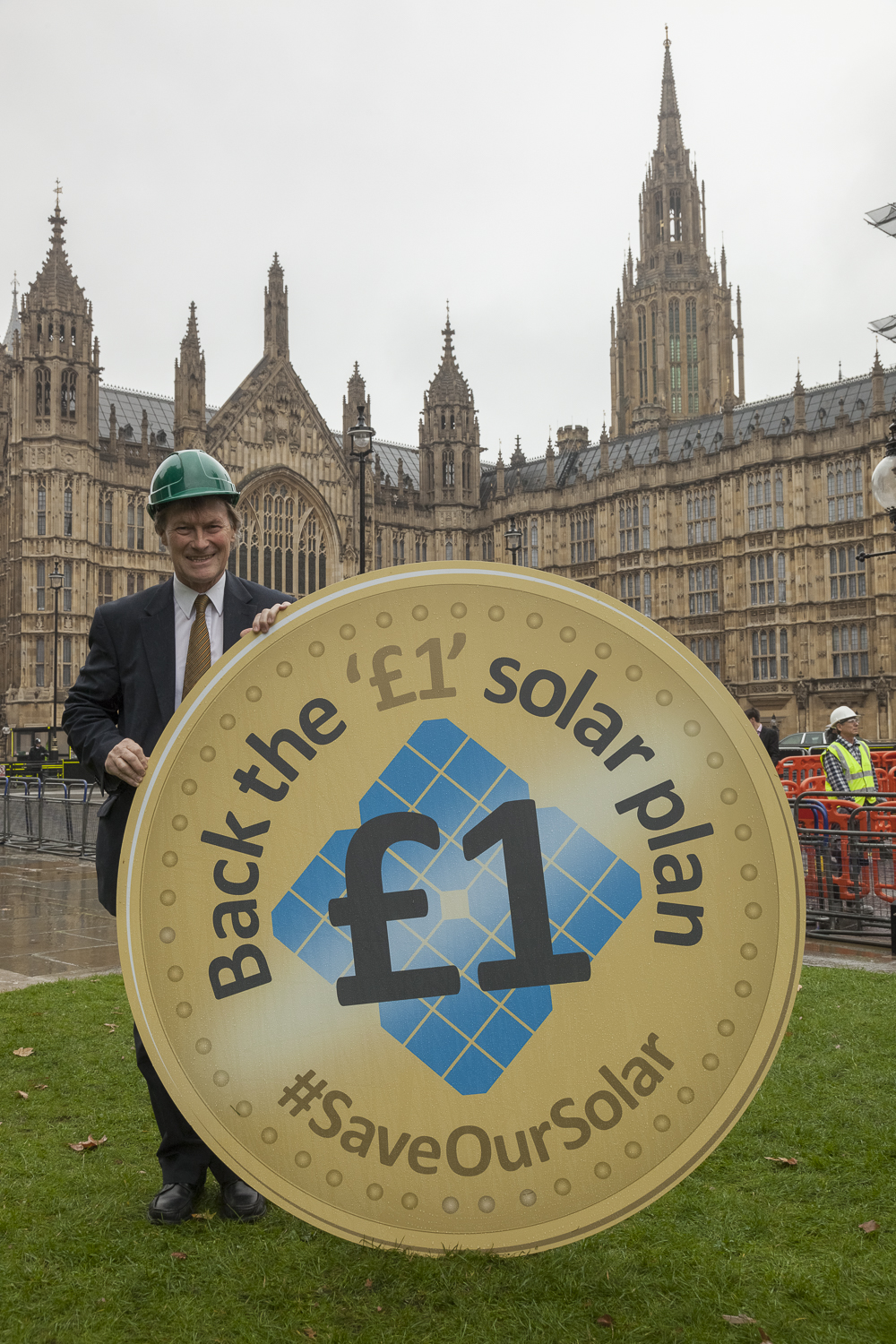
Amess in 2015

Amess's most publicised legislative success came in 2000 with the Warm Homes and Energy Conservation Act. According to a speech in the House of Commons made by Amess, the Act came to fruition after he was drawn out of the Private Members Ballot. He met with Martyn Williams, a campaigner from Friends of the Earth, who convinced him of the need for the Act following on from the death of a constituent in a cold house.

The Act required the Secretary of State to "publish and implement a strategy for reducing fuel poverty".

This Act was widely credited with a significant change in both attitude and policy towards fuel poverty within the UK. The scale of fuel poverty in England fell from 5.1 million households to 1.2 million households between 1996 and 2004, indicating the impact of the Act.

=== Parliamentary committees ===
==== Health Select Committee ====
Amess served on the Health Select Committee from 1998 until 2007. Due to his role on the Health Select Committee, he became Chair of the Conservative Party Backbench Committee for Health in 1999. He campaigned on various health issues since. While a member of the Committee, Amess played a prominent role in holding an inquiry into the state of obesity in the UK, leading to the publication of a report in 2004. The report found that two-thirds of the population of England are overweight or obese and went on to discuss the causes of obesity, as well as making various recommendations to combat the problem. He maintained an interest in the issue, tabling a series of Parliamentary Questions in July 2013.

==== Panel of Chairs ====
Amess was also a member of the Panel of Chairs, which comprises the chairman and two deputy chairmen of Ways and Means, as well as ten members nominated at the start of each session by the Speaker of the House of Commons. Amess was last appointed on 26 May 2010, but had been on the Panel since 2001. As a member of the Panel, Amess was responsible for chairing public bill committees, chairing Westminster Hall debates, and at times, for chairing committees of the whole House.

==== Backbench Business Committee ====
Amess was elected onto the newly formed Backbench Business Committee in 2010; he stood down in 2015.

==== Administration Committee ====
Amess became a member of the Administration Committee in 2015. This committee is responsible for overseeing the running of the Parliamentary Estate and its services. He stepped down from the committee following the 2019 general election.

=== Raoul Wallenberg ===
Amess campaigned for many years to have a statue erected in honour of Raoul Wallenberg, a Swedish diplomat who saved tens of thousands of Jews in Nazi-occupied Hungary and eventually died. Amess began asking parliamentary questions in the late 1980s regarding Wallenberg, campaigning for him to be awarded honorary British nationality. Amess had previously attempted to push through a Raoul Wallenberg (Memorial) Bill in the 1989–90 session. He held an adjournment debate in Wallenberg's honour in 1996. The resultant memorial created by sculptor Philip Jackson was installed in London, at Great Cumberland Place, outside the Western Marble Arch Synagogue and unveiled in 1997.

=== All-party parliamentary group on endometriosis ===
In March 2018, Amess launched an all-party parliamentary group on endometriosis to raise awareness of the condition and to investigate how those who have endometriosis can get the support that they need. Amess chaired the group, with Emma Hardy, Jackie Doyle-Price and Hannah Bardell as vice-chairs.

=== Industry and Parliament Trust ===
Amess became a Fellow of the Industry and Parliament Trust in 1994. Amess completed an IPT Post-Graduate Fellowship I in 2012, specialising in the Cultural and Creative Industries at BRIT School, ITN and the Royal Opera House. Amess became chairman of the board of trustees in 2014 and stood down at the end of his term in 2017.

=== Comments about Weinstein scandal ===
In October 2017, following the Harvey Weinstein sexual misconduct allegations, a statement was issued in the name of Amess which described the allegations against Weinstein as "dubious to say the least" and quoted Amess as having said that the "sudden flurry of alleged inappropriate advances beggars belief". Amess later retracted the statement and apologised "for any upset", saying that his staff had issued the statement without his authorisation.

== Media and publications ==
=== Publications ===
Amess wrote a pamphlet about his 1992 re-election to the Basildon constituency, Basildon—Against all Odds (2012). It was launched in the House of Commons at an event to mark the 20th anniversary of the election and was attended by Prime Minister David Cameron and Conservative Party activists.

Amess compiled a pamphlet titled Party of Opportunity with the Renewal Group, containing thirteen short biographical accounts of Conservative MPs who identify as working class or from a working-class background. The pamphlet, which was launched in the House of Commons in April 2014, included contributions from four government ministers, including Sajid Javid, Mark Francois, Patrick McLoughlin, and Mike Penning. The second edition of Party of Opportunity was launched in January 2015, sponsored by the Association of Conservative Clubs and included contributions from 29 Conservative MPs.

Ayes & Ears: A Survivor's Guide to Westminster was published by Luath Press in December 2020. The book includes sketches of colleagues, memorable speeches, scandals, and descriptions of major events in Parliament from an insider's viewpoint. In February 2021, it was announced that the book had been shortlisted for the Parliamentary Book Awards in the Memoir/Biography category.

=== Brass Eye ===
Amess appeared in the February 1997 "Drugs" episode of the spoof current affairs television programme Brass Eye, and was fooled into filming an elaborate warning against the dangers of a fictional Eastern European drug called "cake". Amess later asked a question about "cake" in Parliament, alongside real substances khat and GHB. In response, the Home Office minister incorrectly replied that "cake" was a name "we understand refers to 3,4-methylenedioxy-N-benzylamphetamine", a real drug. In 2001, when Brass Eye was repeated and released on DVD, a disclaimer was added to the "Drugs" episode at Amess's request reiterating his disapproval of recreational drug use.

== Political views ==
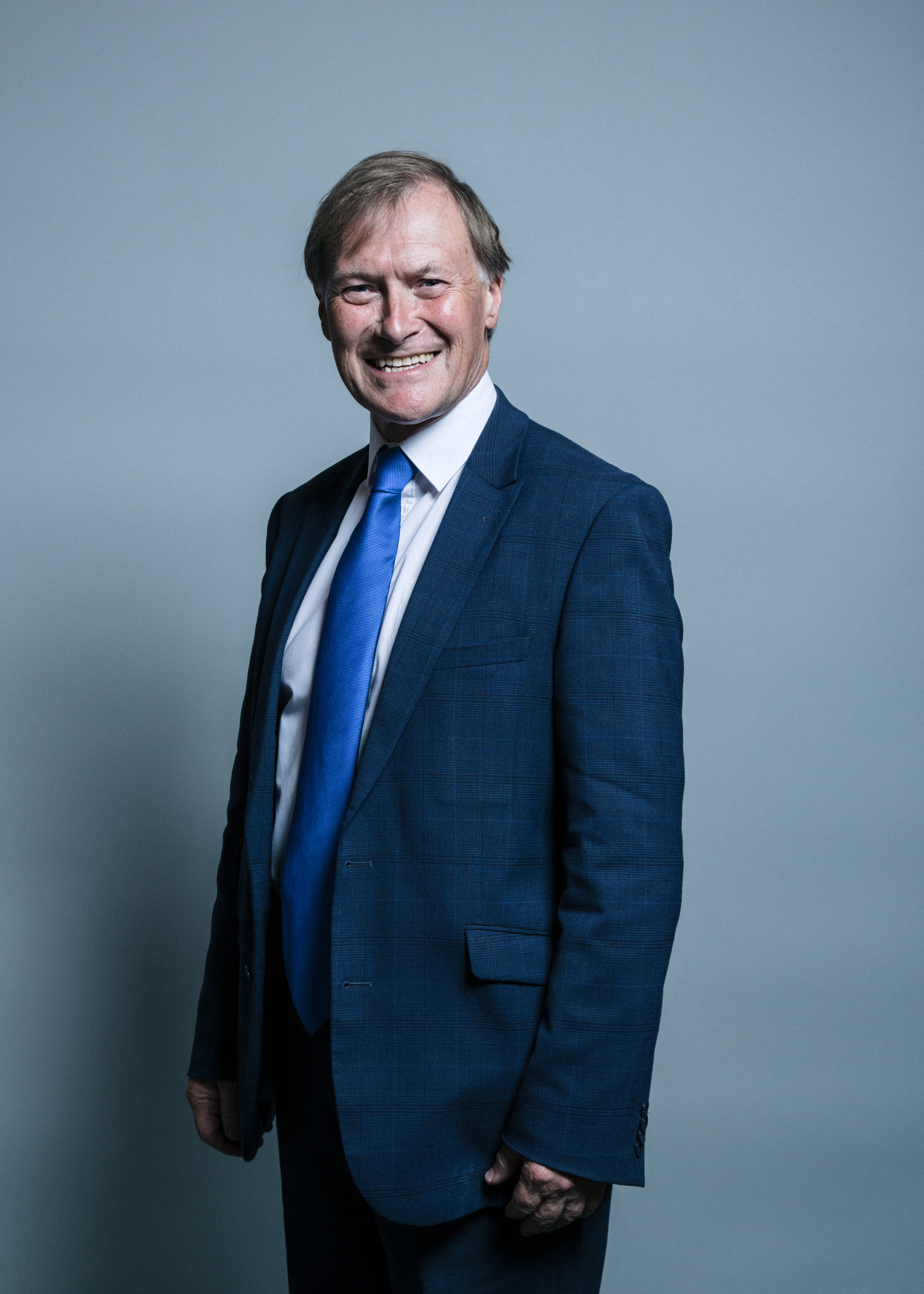
Parliamentary portrait by Chris McAndrew, 2017

Amess normally adhered to Conservative party policy when voting in the Commons. He voted for the 2003 invasion of Iraq but was afterwards critical of the Labour government's failure to find the weapons of mass destruction with which they justified the action at the time. On foreign policy, he was also a leading member of Conservative Friends of Israel (CFI). He was one of the few Conservative MPs to support the campaign to impeach Tony Blair.

Amess was one of 30 Conservatives who voted against military action in Syria in August 2013. He later commented that he felt the way he and his colleagues voted "made a difference" and if he had previously voted against the war in Iraq "things might be different" there as well. Amess supported the reintroduction of capital punishment. He was a critic of the government of Iran, and advocated for the National Council of Resistance of Iran; he publicly endorsed Maryam Rajavi's 10-point manifesto. Amess was supportive of refugees and asylum seekers.

Amess opposed abortion. In June 2005, Amess supported the Prohibition of Abortion (England and Wales) Bill introduced by Laurence Robertson that sought to almost entirely ban abortion. After entering the House of Commons, Amess generally opposed bills furthering LGBT rights, including equal age of consent and same-sex marriage.

Amess campaigned for improvements in animal welfare and husbandry. He consistently voted to ban foxhunting and hare coursing. He was a patron of the Conservative Animal Welfare Foundation. Amess supported many campaigns, including banning cages for game birds, animal testing, puppy farming and smuggling, and ending the transport of live animals for export.

In September 2011, Amess accused the BBC of being biased regarding its reporting of events in Israel, which he said was covered in a "highly disproportionate manner", showing the state in a "poor light".

Amess was a Eurosceptic and came out in support of Brexit prior to the EU referendum, in which he said it was "dangerous" and a "huge mistake" to vote "remain". He described the loss of parliamentary sovereignty and supremacy of EU law as the main negatives of UK–EU relations. Amess criticised then United States president Barack Obama's intervention in the EU referendum campaign when he met with David Cameron, stating that he had "absolutely no right whatsoever getting involved".

== Awards ==
Amess was knighted in the 2015 New Year Honours for political and public service.

At the Dods Charity Champion Awards 2011, Amess won the Animal Welfare and Environment Champion award, in which he was recognised formally for his leading role in and commitment to animal welfare, and was presented with the award by John Bercow, Speaker of the House of Commons, in the State Rooms of the Speaker's House. The award is given to the parliamentarian who has done the most to tackle issues concerning the welfare of animals and the natural environment.

Amess received the "Outstanding Achievement Award" at the Charity Champion Parliamentary reception hosted by Dods in 2012 in recognition of his lifetime commitment to charitable work.

He was nominated for the Policy Driver for Animal Rights Protection award at the Grassroot Diplomat Awards 2014 for his longstanding dedication to animal rights.

== Personal life ==
He and his wife Julia Arnold had one son and four daughters. Arnold was a part-time caseworker for her husband. Their eldest daughter is actress Katie Amess. Amess was a lifelong supporter of Premier League team West Ham United and attended their final game at the Boleyn Ground in May 2016.

As an animal lover, his family had several pets. In 2016, these included a rescue dog; a pug called Lily. Lily was succeeded by a French Bulldog called Vivienne who, shortly after Amess's murder in 2021, won the Westminster Dog of the Year Show.

Amess was the president of the Music Man Project, a local charity that provides musical opportunities to people with learning disabilities. He appeared with the group in performances at the Royal Albert Hall and the London Palladium.

Amess was a supporter of the British Monarchist Society.

== Murder ==
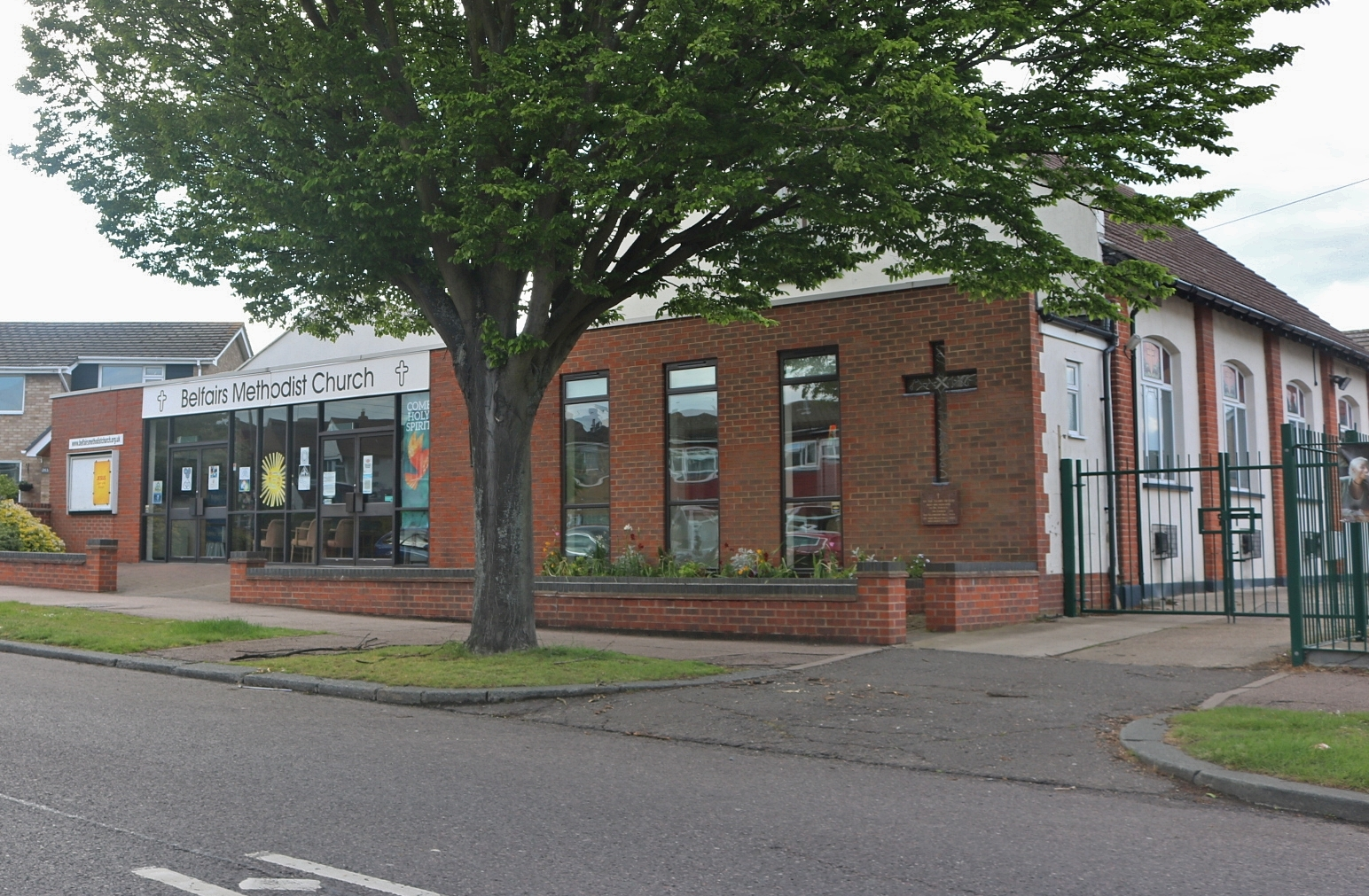
Belfairs Methodist Church, May 2021

On 15 October 2021, Amess was fatally stabbed at his constituency surgery at Belfairs Methodist Church Hall in Leigh-on-Sea. A post-mortem examination determined he died from multiple stab wounds to the chest. His murder was later declared a "terrorist incident" by the Metropolitan Police. The investigation, led by Scotland Yard's Counter Terrorism Command, explored "a potential motivation linked to Islamist extremism". The killer, Ali Harbi Ali, a British citizen of Somali descent, was arrested at the scene, convicted and sentenced to life imprisonment with a whole life order.

=== Funeral ===
A procession and memorial service took place in Southend on 22 November. The private service, attended by family, was held at St Mary's Church, the Church of England parish church in Prittlewell. The Reverend Paul Mackay and Monsignor Kevin William Hale led the service. A family statement was read by the former Conservative MP Ann Widdecombe. Afterwards, his casket processed through the streets in a horse-drawn hearse. The next day a funeral service was held at Westminster Cathedral. Prime Minister Boris Johnson joined former prime ministers, the Speaker of the House Lindsay Hoyle and the Labour leader Sir Keir Starmer at the service. A message from Pope Francis was delivered by Archbishop Claudio Gugerotti, the Apostolic Nuncio to Great Britain.

== Legacy ==
Tributes to Amess

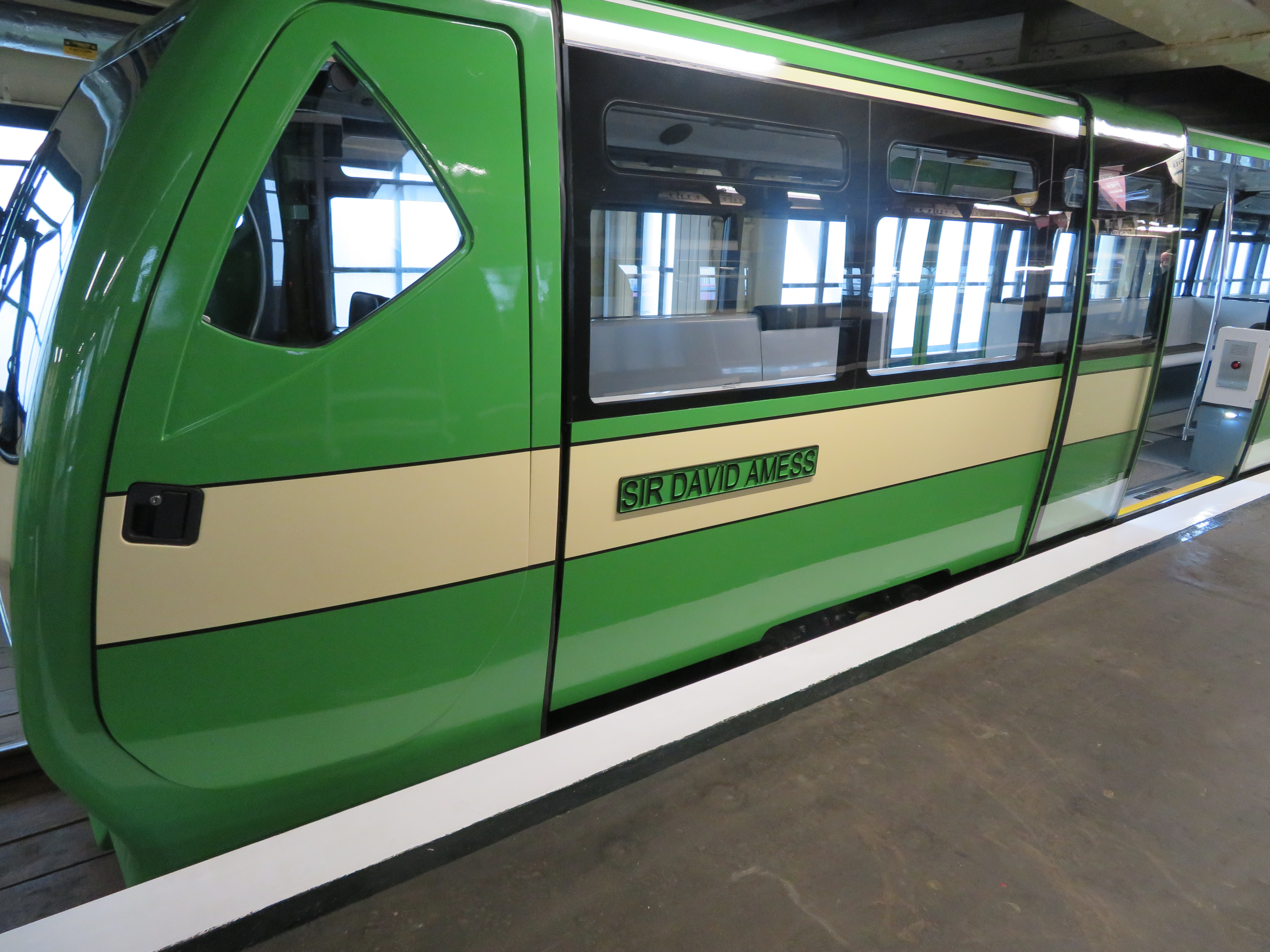
Electric train in Southend named Sir David Amess, 2022

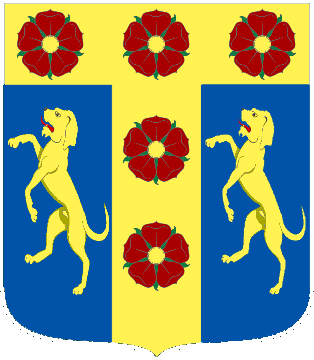
Amess's shield displayed in the Commons chamber

On 1 March 2022, Southend was granted city status by Queen Elizabeth; the city was visited by Prince Charles that day as a tribute to Amess. In October, politicians paid tribute to Amess and a tree was planted in his memory in Southend.

A shield of arms bearing the motto "His Light Remains" was posthumously granted to him, unveiled in the chamber of the House of Commons by his widow in October 2023. In December, a fund was launched in his memory.

A statue of Amess, by sculptor Andrew Lilley, was begun in January 2023. Amess's widow was moved upon seeing its completion in October, stating, "... I felt I could reach out and touch him." The statue was unveiled near the Chalkwell Lifeguards' base in Southend, on 11 April 2024.

Due to Amess's Catholic faith, there was a minor campaign in 2022 for him to be canonised as a martyr by the Catholic Church.

== See also ==
- List of British MPs killed in office
- Jo Cox

Parliament of the United Kingdom
Preceded by Harvey Proctor	Member of Parliament for Basildon; 1983–1997	Succeeded by Angela Smith
Preceded by Paul Channon	Member of Parliament for Southend West; 1997–2021	Succeeded by Anna Firth
