= Rudas =

Rudas is a Hungarian word and surname, literally meaning "of rúd", (Hungarian: rúd "pole", "rod", "beam").

== People with the surname Rudas ==
- Gerő Rudas (né (c.1883) Reichenthal; 1856–1912), Jewish Hungarian-Transylvanian physician
- László Rudas (né Róth) (1885–1950), Hungarian communist newspaper editor and politician
- Ferenc Rudas (né Ruck) (1921–2016), Hungarian football player, coach and sport leader
- Tibor Rudas (1920–2014), Hungarian entrepreneur
- Márta Bajcsay-Rudas(-Antal), née Antal (1937–2017), Hungarian track and field athlete
- Stephan Rudas (1944–2010), Hungarian-Austrian psychiatrist
- Andreas Rudas (born 1953), Hungarian-Austrian media manager and politician
- Laura Rudas (born 1981), Austrian politician

== People with the surname Rudaś ==
- Michał Rudaś (born 1981), Polish singer of pop music, reggae, ethnic, and soul music

== See also ==
- Rudas Baths (Hungarian: Rudas fürdő, Rudas gyógyfürdő), a thermal and medicinal bath in Budapest; Magyariyed from Bosniak and Turkish "rudna ilidže" (bath-bath).
- Ruda

=== Related surnames ===
- Szekeres
