= Budapest University of Technology and Economics =

University in Hungary

Coordinates: 47°28′53″N 19°3′20″E

- Budapesti Műszaki és Gazdaságtudományi Egyetem
- Other name: Műegyetem
- Former names: Institutum Geometrico-Hydrotechnicum; Royal Joseph Polytechnic University; Joseph University of Technology and Economics; Technical University of Budapest
- Motto: Courses in Contemporary Engineering - harmonising theory and practice
- Type: Public university
- Established: 1782; 244 years ago
- Academic affiliations: EUA, CESAER, IAU, Santander Network, DRC, SEFI, AUF, International Student Exchange Programs, IAESTE, ESTIEM, NEPTUN, TIME, Athens Programme, AIESEC, GBME, W3C, Washington University in St. Louis, McDonnell International Scholars Academy
- Chancellor: Miklós Verseghi-Nagy
- Rector: Hassan Charaf
- Students: 20 152 (in 2019)
- Location: Budapest, Hungary
- Colours: Claret
- Website: bme.hu
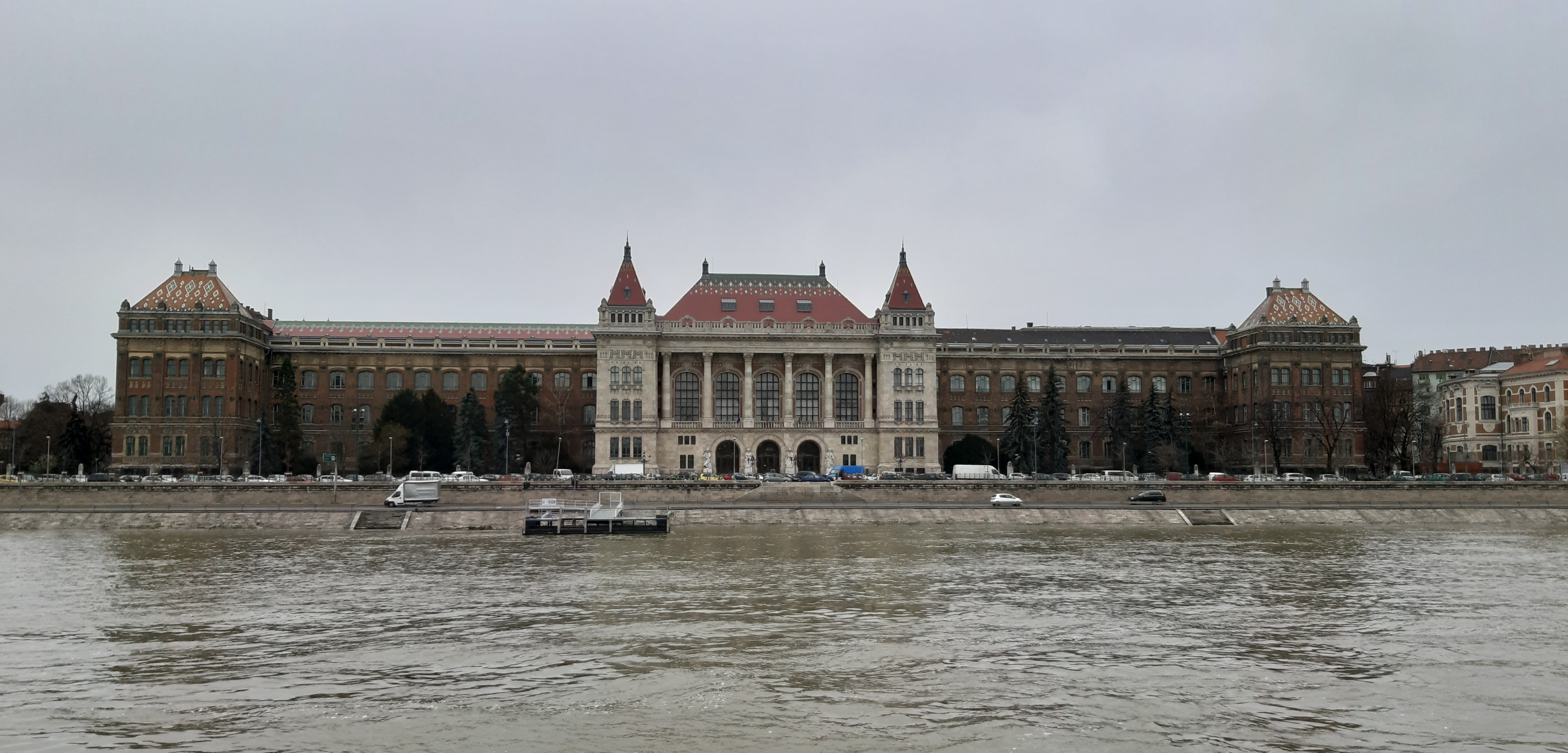

University rankings

Regional – Overall
- QS Emerging Europe and Central Asia: 29 (2022)

The Budapest University of Technology and Economics (Hungarian: Budapesti Műszaki és Gazdaságtudományi Egyetem, shortened to Műegyetem), official abbreviation BME, is a public research university located in Budapest, Hungary. It is the most significant university of technology in the country and is considered the world's oldest institute of technology with university rank and structure, founded in 1782.

More than 110 departments and institutes operate within eight faculties. The University employs about 1100 lecturers, 400 researchers and other degree holders as well as numerous invited lecturers and practising specialists, including 34 members of the Hungarian Academy of Sciences. Approximately 1381 of the university's 21,171 students are foreigners, coming from 50 countries. The University issues about 70% of Hungary's engineering degrees.

Training courses are provided in five languages: Hungarian, English, German, French and Russian.

The ECTS credit system was introduced in 1995. This helps students to enroll in the student exchange program of the European Union, the Socrates (or Erasmus) program, and earn a double degree through the Top Industrial Managers for Europe network.

== History ==
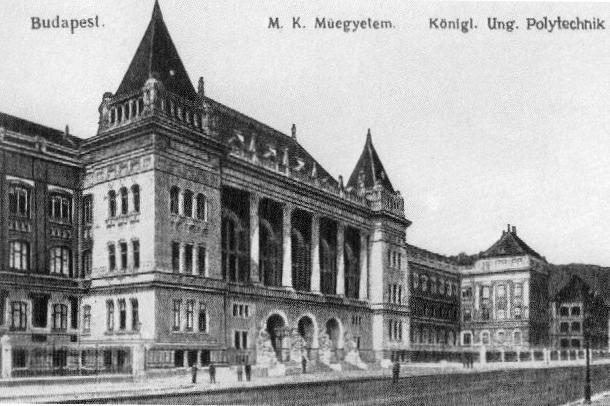
The university in 1909

- 1635 – Archbishop Péter Pázmány, primate of Hungary, founds the University of Nagyszombat (today Trnava, Slovakia)
- Late 18th century – The university moves to Buda and becomes the University of Buda.
- 1735 – The "Berg-Schola," the world's first institute of technology, was founded in Selmecbánya, Kingdom of Hungary (today Banská Štiavnica, Slovakia) in 1735. Many members of the first teaching staff of BME arrived from Selmecbánya.
- 1782 – Emperor Joseph II establishes the Institutum Geometricum as part of the Faculty of Liberal Arts at the University of Buda. The Institutum, the direct predecessor of the Budapest University of Technology and Economics, is the first in Europe to award engineering degrees to students of land surveying, river control, and road construction.
- 1850 – The Institutum Geometricum merges with the Joseph College of Technology.
- 1856 – The merged institutions become the Royal Joseph Polytechnic.
- 1860 – Hungarian replaces Latin as the language of instruction.
- 1862 – Royal Joseph Polytechnic becomes the Royal Joseph University.
- 1872 – Royal Joseph University gains full autonomy and the right to issue engineering diplomas after five years of studies. It is among the first institutions in Europe, to train engineers on university level.
- 1901 – Royal Joseph University is entitled to confer the doctoral degree, "Doctor Rerum Technicarum."
- 1910 – The university moved to its current site near Gellért square (next to the Art Nouveau Hotel Gellért).
- 1925 – First women students enroll.
- 1934 – The university was reorganized again as Palatine Joseph University of Technology and Economics and it played a dominant role in the interwar industrialization process, together with engineering and economist training in Hungary.
- 1939 – The Institute for Continuing Education opens its gates.
- 1949 – The name Technical University of Budapest becomes official. At this time the university consists of the faculties of: Civil Engineering, Mechanical Engineering, Architecture, Chemical Engineering and Electrical Engineering (in historical order).
- 1955 – Faculty of Transportation Engineering is established.
- 1956 – The 1956 Hungarian Revolution was partly launched by students at the university, followed by many professors.
- 1967 – The two technical universities seated in Budapest were merged to form the Technical University of Budapest, with six faculties.
- 1984 – Instruction is offered in English as well as Hungarian.
- 1994 – The Technical University of Budapest is among the first universities in Hungary to introduce the credit system. The university applies the credit assignment according to the European Credit Transfer System (ECTS) in its accredited academic programs.
- 1998 – Faculty of Natural Sciences and Faculty of Economic and Social Sciences are established.
- 2000 – The official name changes to Budapest University of Technology and Economics.

== Faculties ==
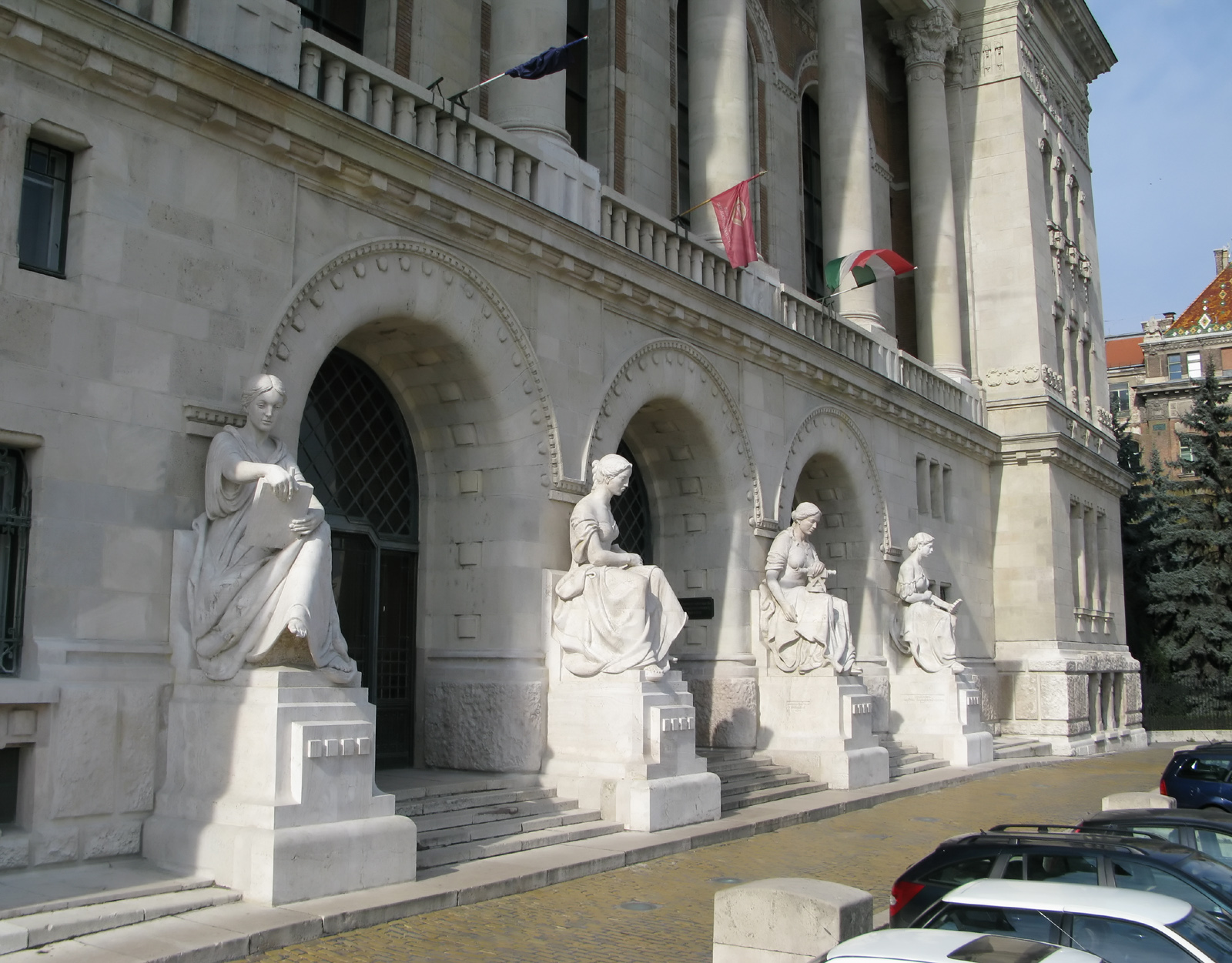
The main entrance of the university's "K" central building with the statues of the first four faculties

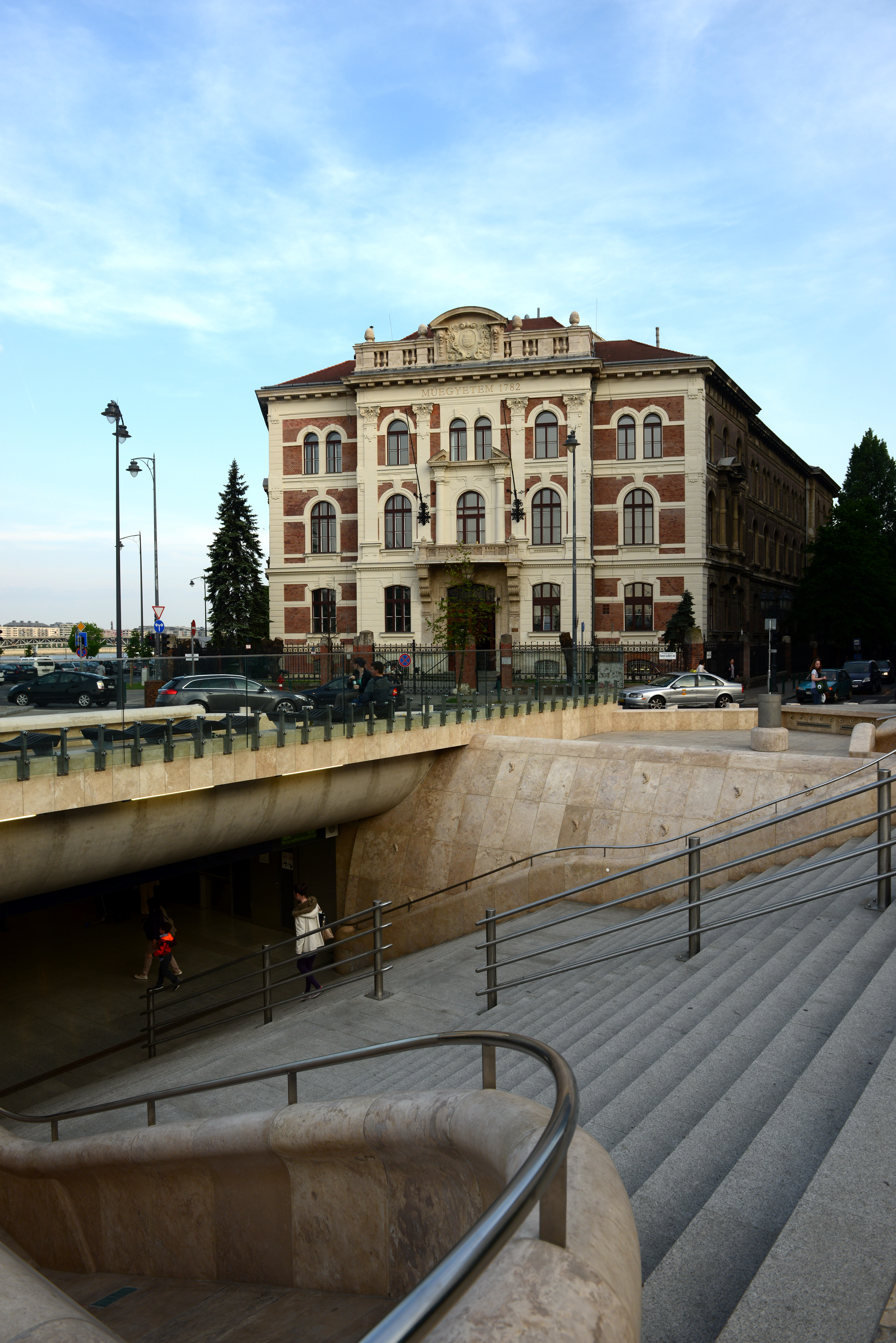
The "Ch" building

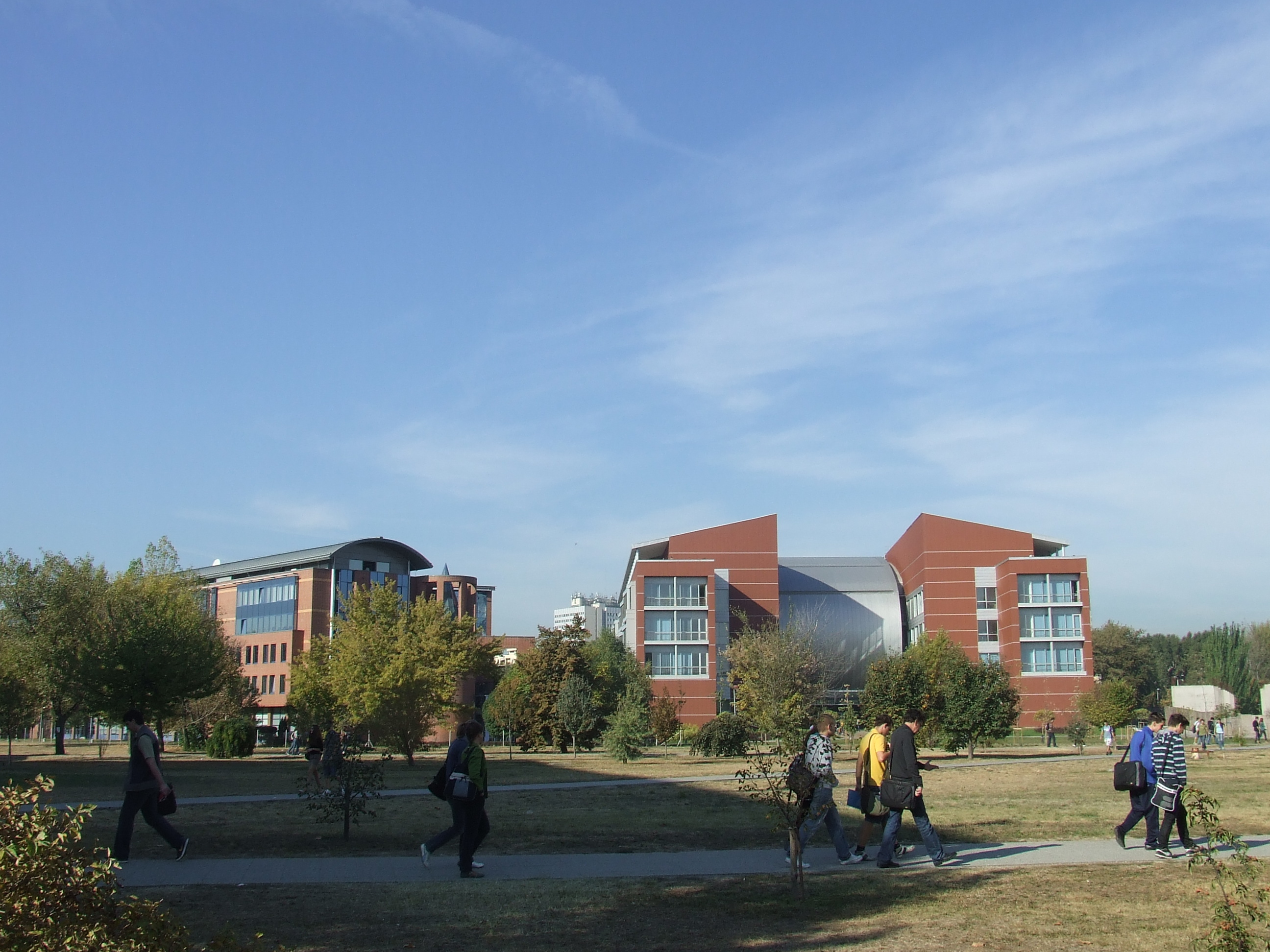
The "I" and "Q" buildings

At present the university has eight Faculties (founding date in parentheses):

=== Faculty of Civil Engineering (1782) ===
- Civil engineering

=== Faculty of Mechanical Engineering (1871) ===
- Mechanical engineering
- Mechatronics engineering
- Energy engineering
- Industrial design engineering
- Industrial Command Engineering

=== Faculty of Architecture (1873) ===
- Architecture

=== Faculty of Chemical Technology and Biotechnology (1873) ===
- Chemical engineering
- Biochemical engineering
- Environmental engineering

=== Faculty of Electrical Engineering and Informatics (1949) ===
- Electrical Engineering
- Computer Science Engineering

=== Faculty of Transportation Engineering and Vehicle Engineering (1955) ===
- Transportation engineering
- Vehicle engineering
- Logistics engineering

=== Faculty of Natural Sciences (1998*) ===
- Mathematics
- Physics
- Computational and Cognitive Neuroscience

=== Faculty of Economic and Social Sciences (1998*) ===
- Technical
  - Engineering management
  - Technical education
- Economic
  - Applied economics
  - Business and management
  - International business
  - Regional and environmental economics
- Social
  - Communication and media studies
- The Faculty of Natural and Social Sciences was founded in 1987 and separated in 1998.

== The organizational structure ==
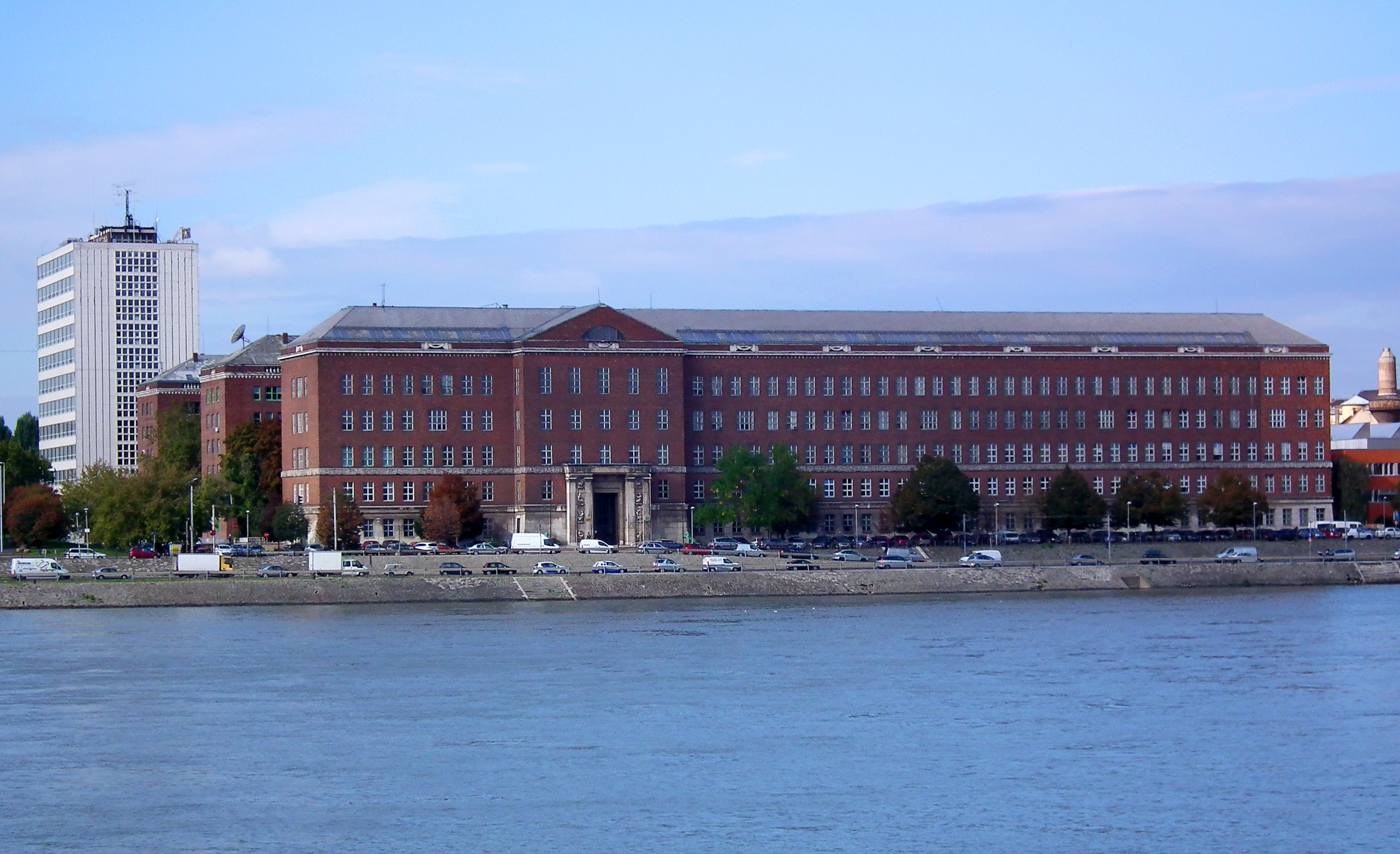
The "R" building is the seat of the Chancellery and the Central Student Office

The Budapest University of Technology and Economics (BME) is a public higher education institute operating as a central budgetary institution. Its founding regulation has been issued by the Minister of Human Resources. Its Organizational and operational conditions are summarized in its own regulation in accordance with laws.

The steering body of the university is the Senate. BME is divided into faculties.

The faculties in the order of their founding:

- Faculty of Civil Engineering (ÉMK)
- Faculty of Mechanical Engineering (GPK)
- Faculty of Architecture (ÉPK)
- Faculty of Chemical Technology and Biotechnology (VBK)
- Faculty of Electrical Engineering and Informatics (VIK)
- Faculty of Transportation Engineering and Vehicle Engineering (KJK)
- Faculty of Natural Sciences (TTK)
- Faculty of Economic and Social Sciences (GTK)

Education, research, innovation and direct additional services are proceeded by the faculties. Work-sharing between the faculties are subject oriented both in the fields of education and that of technology. The organogram of BME is available here. The faculties consist of departments, institutes, research centres that are supported by deans offices and other units. Governing is assisted by the Rectors Office and the Chancellors Office. There is a highly independent Group of integrated internal control.

Faculties and Students organizations are supported by service units.

The core and ancillary activities are supported

- with system management and system support services
  - by the units of Chancellery
- with specialized services, like
  - library and information management
    - by the National Technical Information Centre and Library and within it the University Archives
  - student registration, study management and coordination
    - by the Central Student Office
  - student support and advice management together with cultural services
    - by the Student Service Directorate
  - secretariat of Senate, Rectors Council and Ethics Committee
    - by the Rectors Office
  - assistance to the faculty councils, education committees and other committees of the faculties
    - by deans offices
  - secretariat of the University Committee of Teaching Authorization and Doctoral Council and Scientific Students Association
    - by the Central Student Office
  - assistance to the BME Organization of Union of Higher Education Employee, and the BME Unite of the Union of Employee in Public Culture and Collections, the Council of Public Employee and the BME Committee of Equal Opportunities
    - by the Office of Representations
  - assistance to the governing body of University Student and Doctoral Student Representation (EHDK)
    - by the Student Service Directorate
  - with coordination of independent organizational units and activities
    - by other umbrella organizations

There are other organizations like companies established or owned by the university, welfare institutions, student or teacher activity groups and other organizations associated to the university.

The Rector is the top manager and representative of the university. The Chancellor ensures the technical conditions, the administration, the financial management in order to complete the functions of the university. The Rector and the Chancellor regularly calls executive board meetings to prepare strategic decisions. Employment relations between are regulated in the Annex of the Human Resource Policy.

== Admissions ==
All Hungarians who pass the Hungarian secondary school matura with enough points are eligible for admission, as well as for anyone else in possession of an International Baccalaureate (again, with enough points).

As with all Hungarian universities, a tuition fee of around $1000 has to be paid each semester for the Hungarian program. No extra fee is required for Hungarians for whom it is their first university, unless they spend more than 13 semesters there.

The university offers extensive English language programs on all its faculties, at all levels of study (Preparatory Year, Bachelor of Science, Bachelor of Arts, Master of Science, Doctor of Philosophy). The Tuition fees vary from €2000 - €4500 per semester. 6% of all students come from over fifty countries; the majority of the students in the English Program are from Azerbaijan, China, Pakistan, Kazakhstan and Jordan in the greatest numbers, and students from Malaysia, Ecuador and Saudi-Arabia are among the graduates.

== Location ==
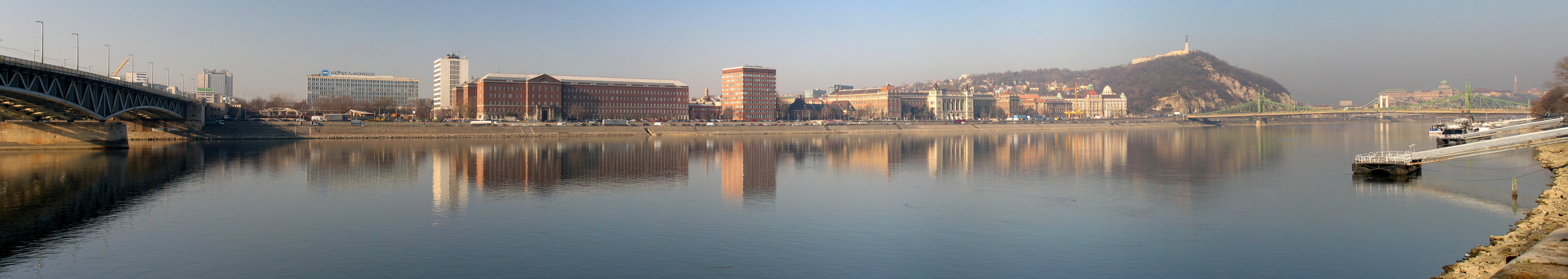
Panoramic view of the buildings of BME

The university is located on the Buda side of the Danube between Szabadság Bridge and Petőfi Bridge and towards Rákóczi Bridge. This makes the university campus especially long and narrow: walking from one side of the university to the other can take as much as 20 minutes.

The Inner City of Budapest (Pest) is just across the river, about 10 minutes' walk by either of the bridges.

== Famous alumni ==
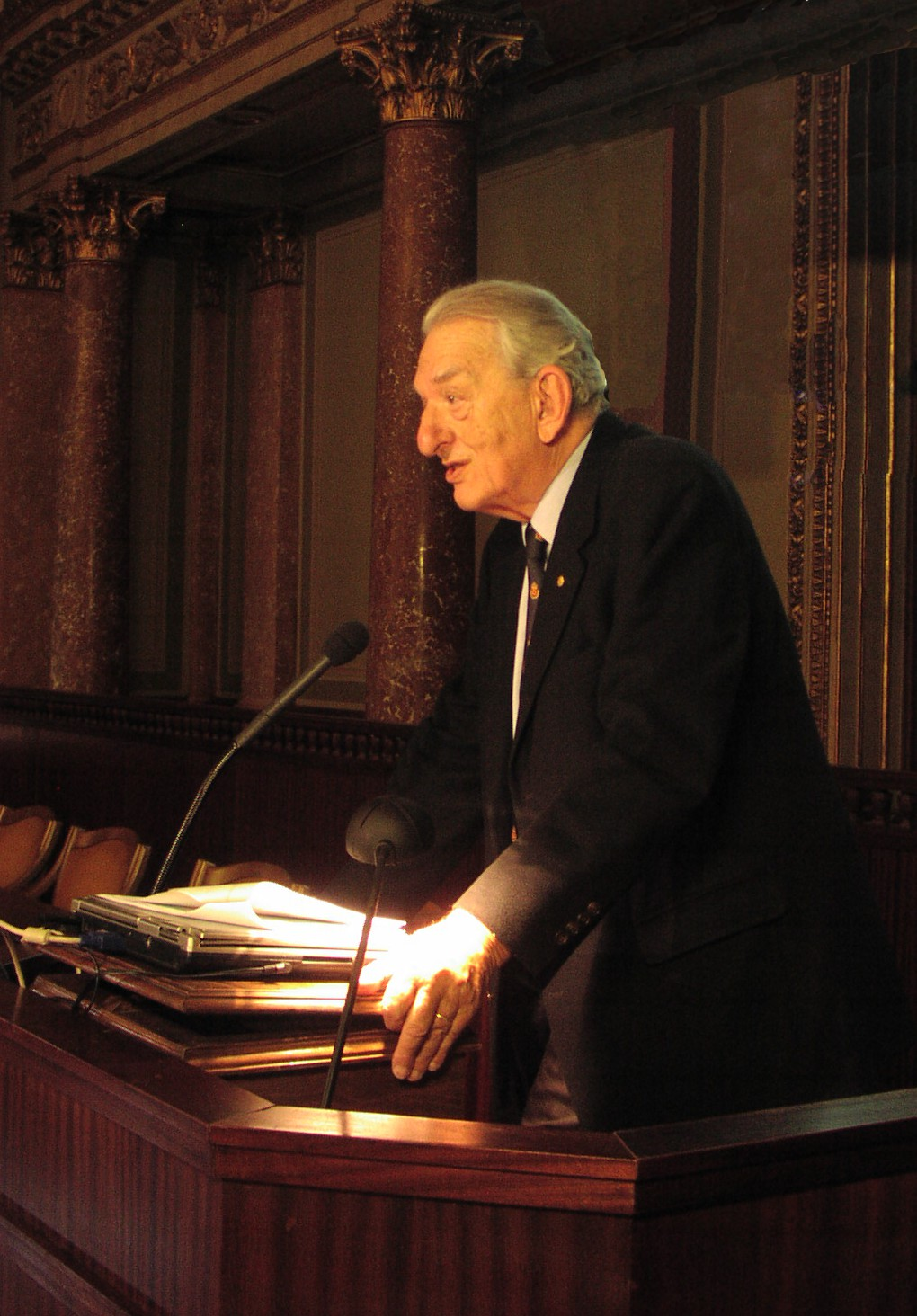
George Olah

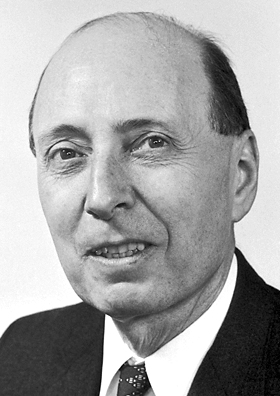
Eugene Wigner

=== Nobel laureates ===
- Dénes Gábor (Dennis Gábor), inventor of holography (1971 Nobel Prize in Physics)
- George Oláh, (1994 Nobel Prize in Chemistry)
- Jenő Wigner (Eugene Wigner), (1963 Nobel Prize in Physics)
- Ferenc Krausz, (2023 Nobel Prize in Physics)

=== Others ===
- András Arató (Electrical engineer and model, known for the internet meme Hide the Pain Harold)
- Aurel Vlaicu (Romanian Engineer known for making the first Aeroplane in Romania)
- Donát Bánki (Co-inventor of the modern carburetor)
- Pál Erdős (Mathematician)
- Károly Ereky (Agricultural engineer, born Károly Wittmann, known as Karl Ereky, coined the notion: biotechnology in 1919)
- Tibor Gallai (Mathematician)
- Alfréd Hajós (Olympic champion swimmer)
- Zoltan Hajos (Organic Chemist)
- Alajos Hauszmann (Architect of the Buda Castle)
- Csaba Horváth (Chemical Engineer, built the first high performance liquid chromatograph)
- Imre Kacskovics (Immunologist and the Dean of the ELTE Faculty of Science)
- Kálmán Kandó ("Father" of the AC powered electric locomotive, Rotary phase converter)
- Tibor Kapu (astronaut)
- Tódor Kármán (Theodore von Kármán, "Father" of super-sonic flight)
- Dénes Kőnig (Mathematician)
- Károly Kós (Architect of the Budapest Zoo and Botanical Garden)
- Imre Makovecz (Architect, one of the most prominent proponents of organic architecture)
- Dénes Mihály (Engineer, inventor)
- Samu Pecz (Architect of the Great Market Hall (Budapest))
- Josef Petzval (Physicist, mathematician and inventor)
- Ernő Rubik (Architect, inventor of mechanical puzzles)
- Frigyes Schulek (Architect of the Fisherman's Bastion)
- George Szekeres (1911–2005), mathematician
- Esther Szekeres (1910–2005), mathematician
- Erzsébet Simonyi (1915–1993) — first woman to earn a veterinary degree in Hungary and founder of the Veterinary Vaccine Control Institute.
- Károly Simonyi (Physicist, father of Charles Simonyi)
- Max Speter (chemist and science historian)
- Imre Steindl (Architect of the Hungarian Parliament)
- George Svéd (then Schlossburger), engineer and academic
- Márta Svéd, mathematician, wife of George Svéd
- Leó Szilárd (Physicist, "father" of the atomic bomb, one of two co-inventors of nuclear reactor)
- Kálmán Tihanyi (First patent on fully electronical TV, Inventor of Plasma TV, CRT-tube pioneer, designed the first pilotless aircraft)
- Eva Vecsei (Architect, based in Montreal)

== Sports ==
The university has one sports club, the Műegyetemi AFC, which played in the first 1901 Hungarian League season. The university hosted the IFIUS 2008 World Interuniversity Games in October.

== National Technical Information Centre and Library ==
The National Technical Information Centre and Library at the Budapest University of Technology and Economics (BME OMIKK) is the successor of two major libraries in Hungary.

=== The Central Library of BME ===
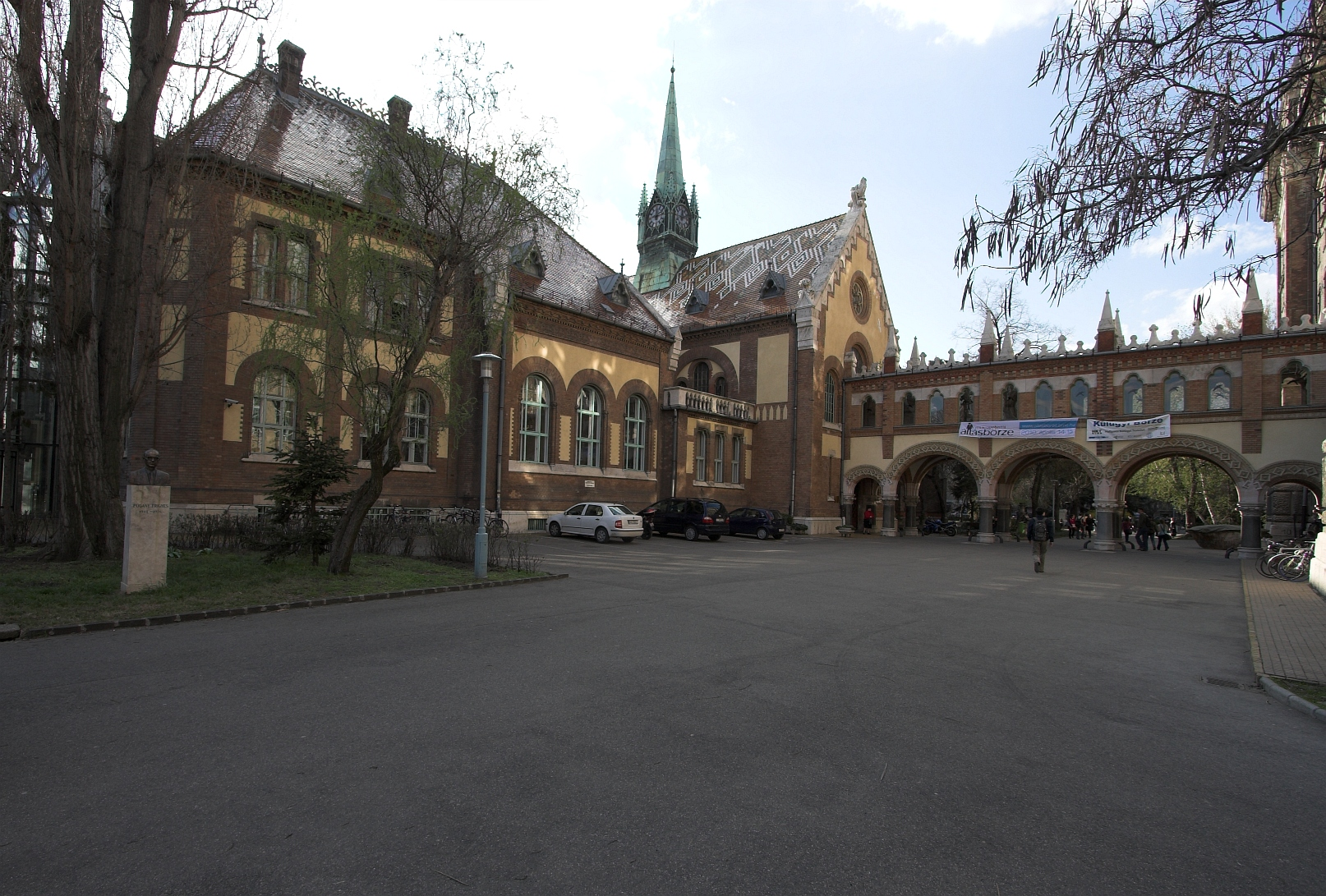
BME OMIKK

The library of the Budapest University of Technology and Economics (then Joseph Polytechnics) was formally founded in 1848 when Baron József Eötvös, Minister of Religion and Public Education donated a book in five volumes that become the first item in the inventory of the library.

Since its foundation it moved with the university from Pest to the Buda Castle in 1854 and back to Pest in 1872. In 1882 it moved again, to the campus near the National Museum, now the campus of Faculty of Humanities of Eötvös Loránd University. In 1909 the Library was moved to a separated cathedral like building in the new Campus of BME. The building was designed by Samu Pécz, professor of architecture at the university. The central Aula connects the spacious, 16.5-meter (54 ft) wide reading room to the north, the multi floor storage facility to the west and the workrooms of library procedures to the south. The eastern facade is connected to the central building of the university with the 'Bridge of Sighs'. The architectural concept has been proven timeless.

Later on the storage capacity was enlarged with the introduction of compact storage technology, and adding a large capacity underground storage facility under the garden of the Campus.

Today a remote storage building near Budapest is also used.

In the beginning the library was directed by university professors. The first full-time director was appointed in 1936.

In the early years the library served only professors. It was opened for students in 1869, and for the general public in 1884.

In 1884 the first classification system of the library was elaborated and the first printed catalogue of the library was published by Vince Wartha, who was by the way professor of urban chemical technologies, dealing with construction materials, with gas production and water supply, and rector of university two times. In the following years extended editions of the printed catalogue were published and distributed to the departments and to other major libraries in the country. In 1936 the library introduced the index card system of catalogue. Transition to electronic cataloguing began in the 1980s, and the integrated library system was introduced in the 1990s. With the spreading of internet and widening the bandwidth the catalogue has become available from anywhere.

The library collection was extended by acquisitions, and with donations of professors. There were two major additions by receiving the heritage of baron József Eötvös in 1872, and of Károly Hieronymi engineer and politician in 1912.

During the Second World War both the building and the collection were damaged. Nevertheless, it continued its work in 1945, and the main reading room was reopened during the academic year of 1949–1950.

Since 1952, increasing amount of the collection has been placed on open shelves for direct access of the readers. In the beginning only fiction, later on handbooks, and nowadays textbooks and current literature can be found on the shelves in the reading rooms. In 1953 the library started publishing serials (Methodical papers of the Central Library of Budapest Technical University, publications on history of science and engineering, Scientific Technical Bibliographies) and some other serials in the 1960s.

Since the mid sixties the library takes part in the instruction of first year students with training on using the library and in teaching literature search skills.

In 1991 the library opened the Study of Natural Sciences with mostly chemistry-regarded literature open shelves.

The library is the centre of the library network of the university, and the thematic library in mathematics and physics.

=== The National Technical Information Centre and Library (OMIKK) ===
In 1883 Ágoston Trefort, minister of education opened the Technological Museum including a library consisting the “basic Hungarian and international literature dealing with industry”. In 1889 the library was moved and merged with the library of Public Polytechnics. In 1921 the Institute of Technological and Material Testing was established, merging two institutions. With the integration, the Library of Technological Institute was formed. From 1923 the library was intensively developed by the direction of Géza Káplány. In 1949 the Library of Technology was formally merged with the Technical Documentation Centre. Since then the library started establishing liaison libraries in the country. In 1952 the name changed to National Technical Library. In 1956 the Library was moved into a representative building near the National Museum. In 1982 with the introduction of electronic technologies and with the development of information exchange of cooperating libraries on multinational level the library took the name of National Technical Information Centre and Library. After several changes in the organization and supervision, in 2001, with the decision of the minister of education, most of the tasks, the staff and the whole collection of the National Technical Information Centre and Library were integrated into the Library of Budapest University of Technology and Economics.

=== BME OMIKK, the integrated library ===
After the integration of the two libraries the Main Reading Room were renovated and under it the Reading Room of Technical and Natural Sciences was created, three reading rooms in the central university building were formed, and a service tunnel connecting the library building with the underground storage facility and with the new reading rooms was constructed. In 2011, following the erection of new university buildings in the new southern (Lágymányos) campus, a new service point of BME OMIKK was opened in building “I”.

== University rank ==
University rankings

Global – Overall
- ARWU World: 801-900 (2019)
- QS World: 711-720 (2026)

The Budapest University of Technology and Economics ranked 250th out of 535 in mechanical engineering by QS 2017 world ranking.

It takes the 322nd place among the world's top 400 universities for engineering and technology, being the only university from Hungary that is listed in Quacquarelli Symonds ranking.

Times Higher Education ranked it as 1001+ in its 2020 world university rankings.

== See also ==
- Műegyetemi AFC
- Matrix (blinkenlights)
