= Katie Amess =

English actress (born 1985)

- Born: Katherine Louise Diana Amess; 19 July 1985 (age 41); Basildon, Essex, England
- Education: Queen Mary University of London; Royal Central School of Speech and Drama
- Occupations: Actress; model
- Years active: 2006–present
- Father: David Amess
- Awards: Miss Essex 2008

Katherine Louise Diana Amess (/ˈeɪmɪs/ AY-miss; 19 July 1985) is an English actress. She has appeared in many TV, film and theatre roles as well as commercials.

== Early life and education ==
Amess was born in Basildon, Essex, the second of five children and the eldest of four daughters of Conservative MP David Amess and his wife Julia Arnold.

She attended St Anne Line Primary School in Basildon before going to the Brentwood Ursuline Convent High School in Brentwood, Essex, and finally St Bernard's High School in Westcliff-on-Sea, Essex. She went on to study drama at Queen Mary University of London and the Royal Central School of Speech and Drama in London.

== Career ==
Amess competed in several British beauty pageants and won the title of Miss Essex 2008 for the Miss Earth 2008 contest. In the same year she also became a finalist for the Miss England competition.

She has appeared in a host of television commercials including for Nintendo, Premier Inn with Lenny Henry and News of the World, Google and EE Broadband with Kevin Bacon. She appeared as Paris Hilton in two national commercials. She has appeared on various television shows in the UK including Funny Cuts on E4 and Dream Team.

In 2013, Amess signed on to play a lead in the musical parody Miserable Lesbians in New York and Edinburgh. The show was adapted from the Oscar-winning Les Misérables.

She was cast as Lulu in William Friedkin's version of Harold Pinter's The Birthday Party at The Geffen Playhouse alongside Tim Roth, Steven Berkoff, David O'Hara, Frances Barber and Nick Ullett. She went on to play Ulcie in the closing week of Rolin Jones' These Paper Bullets at the same theatre in 2015.

Amess played Brenda Dixon in Ray Cooney's Cash on Delivery, alongside Cooney himself in December 2015. The performance received positive reviews: "The ensemble [..] under Cooney's keen direction are all great [...] Katie Amess as Norman's innocent, confused fiancee Brenda. There is not a flaw, not a missed cue. No one stands above anyone else. Cooney as director has gleaned a perfect sense of timing from the entire cast". "The equally looks-blessed Meire, Arcilla, and Amess prove themselves all three expert comediennes [...] Amess's delightful but dim Brenda match[es] the male costars every step of the way".

In 2016, she appeared in the film Captain America: Civil War. In 2017, she played Kendall Nagel in Bull on CBS and Sandy Weeks in Criminal Minds Beyond Borders Season 2 also on CBS. Amess played Heather in the comedy Fifth of July opposite Jaleel White and in 2023 appeared as Alex Butler, opposite Judd Nelson and Jeff Fahey in The Final Run.

== Personal life ==
Following her father's murder in 2021, it was reported that Amess had agreed to continue his work mentoring children considering politics by becoming the patron of the UK's Children's Parliament. She also expressed her belief that the government's anti-radicalisation scheme Prevent failed her father "catastrophically". Amess later revealed that her mother had suffered a stroke in the year following the murder. In response to the Home Secretary rejecting an inquiry appeal into the murder of David Amess, Katie, on her mother's behalf, described it as "unacceptable" and "insulting". After a meeting with the Prime Minister, she acknowledged disappointment that the result could not be changed but held out "hope" that it would be renewed in the future. In March 2026, Amess and her family took part with Robert Buckland leading an independent review into state failings prior to the murder.

== Filmography ==
=== Film ===
Year	Title	Role	Notes
2006	Halal Harry	Party Goer	
2007	Harry Potter and the Order of the Phoenix	Ravenclaw Student	Uncredited
2007	Octane	Katie Martinez	
2011	Minds, Adolescents	Patient Olivia	
2016	Captain America: Civil War	Woman in Lobby #1	
2019	5 July	Heather	

=== Television ===
Year	Title	Role	Notes
2006	Dream Team	Journalist	Episode: "The Man in the White Suit"
2006	E4 Comedy	Frau Heidi	Episode: "The German Tourist Board"
2006	Bad Girls	Cashier	Episode #8.5
2011	America's Court with Judge Ross	Janice Kutcher	Episode: "I'm Gonna Sue You, Sister/Hang the DJ"
2012	The Good Drunk	Farrah Olsen	3 episodes
2012	Massholes	Bartender	Episode: "Good Will Hollywood"
2012–2013	Big Ass Agency	Alice Evans	3 episodes
2015	This Is Only Temporary	Chantelle	Episode: "Extra Extra"
2015	Lost Angels	Kat Fisher	Episode #1.1
2016	The Hotel Barclay	Victoria	Episode: "The Pin-Up"
2017	Bull	Kendall Nagel	Episode: "Bring It On"
2017	Criminal Minds: Beyond Borders	Sandy Weeks	Episode: "Obey"
2018	We Are CVNT5	Receptionist	Episode: "Crushed It"
