= Driving Instructors (Registration) Act 2016 =

- Act of Parliament
- Parliament of the United Kingdom
- Long title: An Act to make provision about the registration of driving instructors.
- Citation: 2016 c. 16
- Introduced by: Sir David Amess (Commons); Earl Attlee (Lords)
- Territorial extent: England and Wales, Scotland but Sections 5-7 Also Extend to Northern Ireland

Dates
- Royal assent: 12 May 2016
Other legislation
Relates to	Road Traffic Act 1988

Status: Current legislation

History of passage through Parliament

Text of statute as originally enacted

Revised text of statute as amended

The Driving Instructors (Registration) Act 2016 (c. 16) is an Act of the Parliament of the United Kingdom that amends certain sections of the Road Traffic Act 1988, in respect of the registration of driving instructors.

The act provides for measures to simplify the registration and deregistration of driving instructors from the Approved Driving Instructor register.

Prior to the amendments made by this act a driving instructor was added to the register on qualification and remained on the list for a period of 4 years at which point they would be required to undertake a quality check to ensure they had retained the approved standard.

The issue that this act sought to overcome was that a person could only be removed from the register if their registration expires or they were removed from the register for conduct, competence or disciplinary reasons.

The act sought to amend the original legislation in the Road Traffic Act 1988 to allow for voluntary deregistration from the register.

== Legislative passage ==
The legislation was passed as a private member's bill.

== Content of the Act ==
=== Amendments to existing regime ===
Section 1 introduced a new section, section 126A to the Road Traffic Act 1988 to deal with re-entry to the register following the expiry of registration where an application is made within one year or removal or four years of removal subject to passing a fitness test.

Section 2 introduced a new sections, section 128AZA in respect of voluntary removal from the register and section 128AZB in respect of re-entry to the register following voluntary removal. Section 128AZA required to Registrar to remove a person's name from the register where a person had requested it to be removed. Section 128AZB allowed for re-registration following voluntary deregistration under similar terms to those brought in under Section 1 following expiry.

Sections 3 and 4 made amendments to the Road Safety Act 2006 to bring this act in line with the amendments made to the Road Traffic Act 1988 as a result of sections 1 and 2.

=== General Provisions ===
Sections 5,6 & 7 of the Act included general provisions relating to consequential amendments, transitional provisions, the territorial extent of the act and its commencement date.

== Reception ==
The legislation was supported by both the Labour and Conservative frontbenches.
