= David Paget =

Australian mathematician and educator (1943–1997)

- Born: David Frederick Paget; 9 February 1943; Twickenham, London, United Kingdom
- Died: 30 November 1997 (aged 54)
- Education: University of Tasmania
- Known for: Mathematics education
- Awards: BH Neumann Award (1997)
- Scientific career
- Fields: Mathematics and education
- Workplaces: University of Tasmania
- Doctoral advisor: David Elliott

David Frederick Paget (February 9, 1943 – November 30, 1997) was an Australian mathematician.

Paget was born in Twickenham and attended Southampton University, where he studied mathematics and played rugby. He emigrated, first to New Zealand and then to Tasmania.

Paget received his PhD from the University of Tasmania, writing his thesis on product integration under the supervision of David Elliott. He became a senior lecturer at the University of Tasmania.

As a mathematician, Paget was interested in the numerical analysis and approximation theory. He has an Erdős number of 3.

It was, however, in mathematics education that Paget made his most significant contribution. He coached the Hobart team to strong performances in the Tournament of the Towns and led the Australian team at the International Mathematical Olympiad from 1991 to 1995. One team member, Akshay Venkatesh, went on to win the Fields Medal.

For his contributions to mathematics education, Paget was awarded the BH Neumann Award in 1997 and Paget St in Bruce, ACT was named after him in 2008.

Paget was married with four children. As a hobby he collected cigarette cards.
