= Sheila Oates Williams =

Australian mathematician

Sheila Oates Williams (1939 – 12 August 2024), also published as Sheila Oates and Sheila Oates Macdonald was a British and Australian mathematician specialising in abstract algebra. She was the namesake of the Oates–Powell theorem in group theory, and a winner of a B. H. Neumann Award.

== Early life and education ==
Sheila Oates Sheila Oates Williams was born in 1939. She grew up in Cornwall, England, where her father was a primary school headmaster in Tintagel.

She was educated at Sir James Smith's Grammar School, and inspired to become a mathematician by a teacher there, Alfred Hooper. She read mathematics at St Hugh's College, Oxford, with Ida Busbridge as her tutor, and continued at Oxford as a doctoral student of Graham Higman. She completed her doctorate (D.Phil.) in 1963.

== Career ==
Oates became a lecturer and fellow at St Hilda's College, Oxford, before moving to Australia in 1965. In 1966, she took a position as senior lecturer at the University of Newcastle and later moved to the University of Queensland as reader.

She retired in 1997.

== Contributions ==
As a student at Oxford, with Martin B. Powell, another student of Higman, she proved the Oates–Powell theorem. This is an analogue for group theory of Hilbert's basis theorem, and states that all finite groups have a finite system of axioms from which can be derived all equations that are true of the group. That is, every finite group is finitely based.

As well as for her research, Williams was known for her work setting Australian mathematics competitions, including the International Mathematical Olympiad in 1988 and the Australian Mathematics Competition. She also participated several times in the Australian edition of the Mastermind television quiz show.

She was also published under the names Sheila Oates and Sheila Oates Macdonald.

== Recognition ==
Williams was a 2002 recipient of the B. H. Neumann Award for Excellence in Mathematics Enrichment of the Australian Maths Trust.

== Death ==
Williams died on 12 August 2024.
