= Brentwood Ursuline Convent High School =

Location
- Queen's Road; Brentwood, Essex, CM14 4EX; England; 51°37′04″N 0°18′16″E

Information
- Other name: BUCHS
- Type: Academy
- Motto: Duty
- Religious affiliation: Roman Catholic
- Established: 1900
- Founder: Reverend Mother Clare
- Local authority: Essex County Council
- Oversight: Roman Catholic Diocese of Brentwood
- Trust: Brentwood Ursuline Convent High School
- Department for Education URN: 138834 Tables
- Ofsted: Reports
- Head teacher: Richard Wilkin
- Gender: Girls
- Age range: 11–18
- Enrolment: 1,088 (2018)
- Capacity: 1,047
- Houses: Angela's; Brescia's; Clare's; John's; Trinity; Ursula's
- Colours: Brown, gold, blue
- Song: Dear Covent home
- Newspaper: Fairview Chronicle
- Alumni name: Old Girls
- Website: www.brentwoodursuline.co.uk

Brentwood Ursuline Convent High School (BUCHS) is an 11–18 girls, Roman Catholic, secondary school and mixed sixth form with academy status in Brentwood, Essex, England. It was established in 1900 and is an Ursuline school. It is located in the Roman Catholic Diocese of Brentwood.

== History ==
The school first opened in 1900 as a Catholic girls' school, which until the 1990s had boarders. Until the Education Act 1918, there were two schools, St Mary's for ladies and St Philomena's for tradesmen's daughters. These schools then merged. It was a direct grant grammar school for girls, with the Brentwood School being a similar school for boys. It became a comprehensive in 1979. In September 1999 the school became a specialist Arts College. It converted to academy status in 2012.

== Notable alumni ==
- Marie José of Belgium, Princess of Belgium; the last Queen of Italy (in May/June 1946)
- Katie Amess, actress
- Cassyette, musician
- Josephine D. Edwards, mathematician
- Betty Laine, dance teacher and founder of Laine Theatre Arts
- Eileen O'Casey, Irish actress and author

== See also ==
- Secondary schools in Essex
- List of direct grant grammar schools
- Ursuline High School, Wimbledon
