= Ida Busbridge =

British mathematician, president of the Mathematical Association

- Born: 10 February 1908; Plumstead, Kent, England
- Died: 27 December 1988 (aged 80); Bromley, Kent, England
- Education: Royal Holloway College
- Known for: Mathematics
- Scientific career
- Thesis: Fourier Integrals
- Notable students: Sheila Oates Williams

Ida Winifred Busbridge (1908–1988) was a British mathematician who taught at the University of Oxford from 1935 until 1970. She was the first woman to be appointed to an Oxford fellowship in mathematics.

== Early life and education ==
Ida Busbridge was born to Percival George Busbridge and May Edith Webb on 10 February 1908. She was the youngest of four children. Her father died when she was 8 months old of complications from influenza. This left her mother, a primary school teacher, to care for the children.

Busbridge started her schooling at 6 in a school in her mother's district. She moved schools to Christ's Hospital in 1918, having won a scholarship at the age of ten. Here she received a firm grounding in mathematics from Miss Mitchener. Busbridge became head girl of the school and was later described as the most brilliant pupil in its 400-year history.

In 1926 she enrolled in Royal Holloway College, London, intending to specialise in physics, but switched to mathematics in 1928. She turned down a place at Newnham College Cambridge as the scholarship to Royal Holloway was significantly more generous. During her schooling she was involved in the Choral Society and University Choir along with the Science Discussion Society.

Busbridge graduated in 1929 with first class honours and was the awarded the Sir John Lubbock Prize for best first class honours of all London University Colleges. She continued her education at Royal Holloway, earning a masters with distinction in mathematics in 1933.

== Career ==
She began teaching as a demonstrator in mathematics at University College, London in 1933.

She moved to St Hugh's College Oxford in 1935 to teach mathematics alongside Dorothy Wrinch to undergraduates of five women's colleges. Influenced by Madge Adam and Harry Plaskett, she shifted her interest to applications of maths in astronomy and physics.

During the Second World War, her workload increased to take on the education of physicists and engineers at Oxford. Her workload was especially great - not only because other mathematicians at the university were called up for special war service - but also because women formed a higher percentage of the undergraduate population during the war years. She was appointed to a Fellowship of St Hugh's College, Oxford, in 1946 – the first women to be appointed to a college fellowship in mathematics.

In 1962, she was awarded a Doctor of Science degree by Oxford. She was also a Fellow of the Royal Astronomical Society.

She was president of the Mathematical Association for 1964.

Busbridge's work included integral equations and radiative transfer. She was highly regarded as a lecturer and tutor, attending to her students' educational and personal needs. She retired from Oxford in 1970, and became one of the early tutors and developers of courses at the Open University, teaching Lebesgue integration and tutoring complex analysis.

Ida Busbridge died on 27 December 1988. A funeral service was held on 9 January 1989 in the church in Keston, where her ashes were later interred, and a memorial service was held at St Hugh's College Oxford on 25 February 1989. The principal, Rachel Trickett, quoted Dorothy Wrinch in describing Ida Busbridge as ‘quite simply the best woman mathematician I’ve ever met: brilliant and yet so capable and unassuming’.

== Commemoration ==
In 1983, a former student made a donation of £280,000 to endow the Ida Busbridge fellowship in mathematics at St Hugh's.

Ida Busbridge's biography was published by the Oxford Dictionary of National Biography on 13 August 2020 as part of their collection of biographies of astronomers and mathematicians.
