= Australian Maths Trust =

Mathematics competition

The Australian Maths Trust (AMT), formerly Australian Mathematics Trust, is a not-for-profit organisation aimed at helping students to develop their abilities in maths. The AMT was formed in 1992 from a merger of the Mathematics Olympiad (founded 1979) and the Australian Mathematics Foundation (founded 1987).

The Australian Mathematics Competition (AMC) is a mathematics competition for school students run by the AMT. The Australian Mathematical Olympiad Committee (AMOC) runs the Australian Mathematical Olympiad (AMO), supporting Australian students to enter the International Mathematical Olympiad and the European Girls' Mathematical Olympiad.

Since 1992, AMT has awarded the BH Neumann Award to recognise AMT volunteer members for their contributions to the teaching and learning of mathematics in Australia.

== AMT history ==
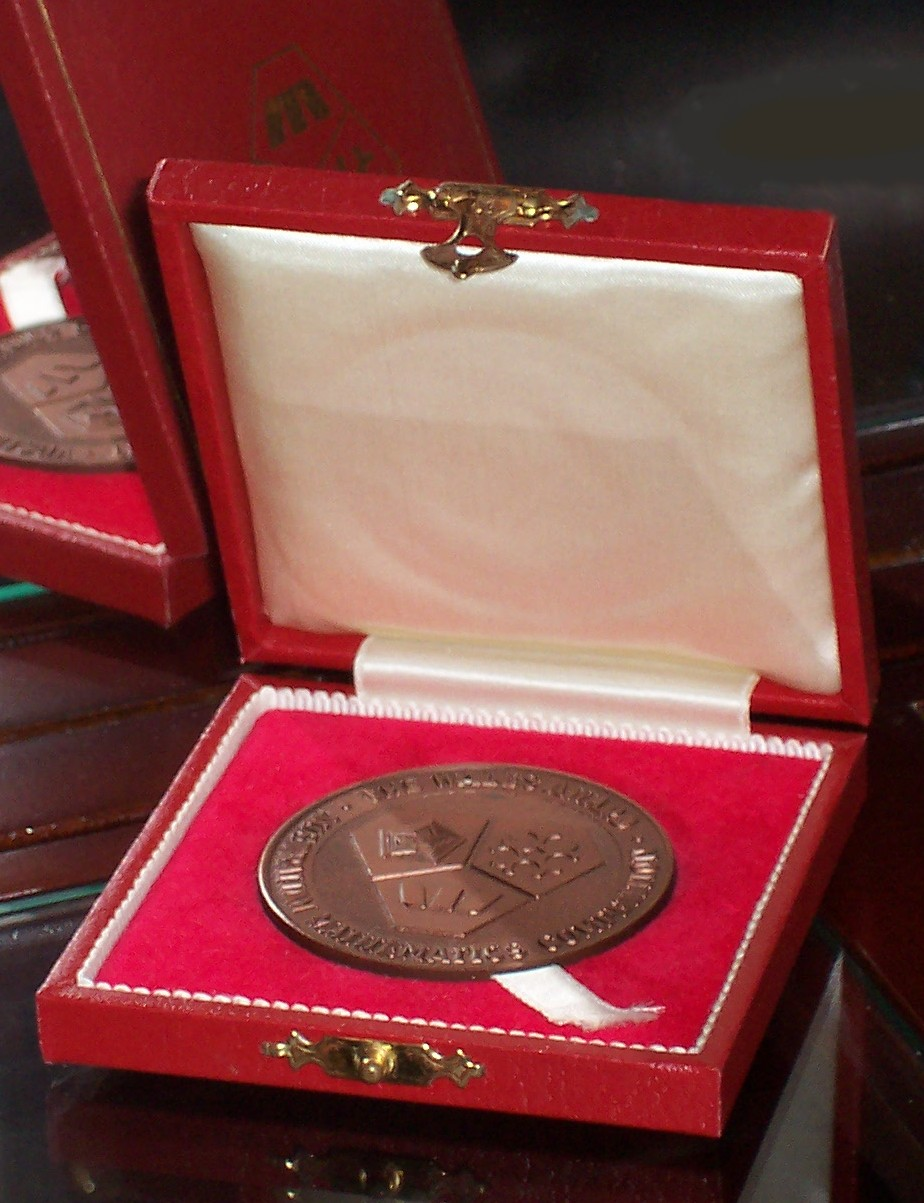
Wales award from 1978

The forerunners of the Australian Maths Trust were the Mathematics Olympiad (1979-1992) and the Australian Mathematics Foundation Limited (1987-1992). In 1992, the two organisations merged and established the Australian Mathematics Trust (AMT).

All of these organisations were founded with the goal of assisting Australian secondary students to realise their potential in problem-solving through mathematics and algorithmics. AMT took on the running of the Olympiad through the Australian Mathematical Olympiad Committee (AMOC) as well as running the Australian Mathematics Competition.

The Australian Mathematics Trust was later rebranded Australian Maths Trust.

=== People ===
O'Halloran undertook a 12-month study tour in Canada and Europe, including some time at the University of Waterloo in Canada, where he observed their mathematics competition. Upon his return in July 1973, he sought out people who may be interested in establishing something similar in Australia. Early volunteers included Laci Kovacs, Mike Newman, Bob Bryce, Martin Ward, and Josephine Dianne Edwards (Jo).

Jo Edwards (1942–1985) was one of the main instigators and administrators of the competition. She was the foundation chair of the Organising Committee, a member of the AMC Board of Governors from 1977 until 1985, and editor of AMC Publications from 1979.

Bernard Neumann supported Peter O'Halloran and colleagues in the early days of the Australian Mathematics Competition, and continued his interest in the competitions and organisations. He was chair of Australian Mathematical Olympiad Committee (AMOC) from its establishment in 1980 until 1986, and was also involved in the International Mathematical Olympiads.

Cheryl Praeger is a foundation member of the AMT board, and was appointed chair of the Australian Mathematical Olympiad Committee in 2001. Nalini Joshi was a member of the AMT board from August 2010 to 2013.

== AMC history ==
The forerunner of the Australian Mathematics Competition, first held in 1976, was open to students within the Australian Capital Territory, and attracted 1,200 entries. In 1976 and 1977, the outstanding entrants were awarded the Burroughs medal.

The competition went national in 1978, when it was named the Australian Mathematics Competition. It attracted over 60,000 entries, including some from New Zealand. Canberra student Ezra Getzler's name once again featured prominently. Among other dignitaries to attend the awards ceremony were the Governor-General of Australia, Sir Zelman Cowen and the chairman of the Bank of New South Wales, Sir Noel Foley.

== Description and governance ==
The AMT is a not-for-profit organisation run by volunteers, aimed at helping students to develop their interest and achieve their potential in maths. It was later rebranded Australian Maths Trust.

== Competitions ==
=== AMC ===
As of 2023, the Australian Mathematics Competition is an online competition consisting of 30 problems. The competition paper consists of twenty-five multiple-choice questions and five integer questions, which are ordered in increasing difficulty.

Since 2017 the AMT has awarded the Cheryl Praeger Medal to the best performing female contestants in the Australian Mathematics Competition.

=== AMO ===
The Australian Mathematical Olympiad Committee (AMOC) runs the Australian Mathematical Olympiad (AMO). This was formerly a two-day event taking place in February. Since January 2026, the competition has been broken up: around 250 students participate in each of AMO Summer and AMO Winter competitions, and the 60 top students go on to participate in the AMO Finals. These competitions are supported by the Australian Government Department of Industry, Science and Resources, and sponsor Jane Street Capital.

As of 2026 the AMOC's stated aims are to "support the development and delivery of high-quality, high-level problem solving opportunities for young Australians, including Maths for Young Australians program, and the activities and programs linked to the identification and training of young Australians selected to represent Australia at the International Mathematical Olympiad and the European Girls' Mathematical Olympiad.

== BH Neumann Award ==
The B. H. Neumann Award for Excellence in Mathematics Enrichment, or BH Neumann Award, "honours the influence of Professor Bernhard H Neumann". It has been awarded to one or more recipients by the AMT since 1992, "to recognise significant service to mathematics and the objects of the Trust". The award is the AMT's "the highest honour and acknowledgement", and is for AMT volunteers "who have made a significant, ongoing and vital contribution to the teaching and learning of mathematical problem-solving in Australia". In general the awards are only given to mathematicians, although there have been at least two honorary recipients of the award. As of March 2026, the last awards recorded were presented in 2022.

Winners of the award include:

- MF (Mike) Newman (1993)
- Esther Klein Szekeres
- George Szekeres
- Anne Penfold Street
- Márta Svéd
- Michael A. B. Deakin
- Josephine Edwards
- Cheryl Praeger
- Jacqui Ramagge
- Sheila Oates Williams
- David Paget
