= George Svéd =

Hungarian-Australian engineer (1910–1994)

George Svéd AM
- Born: György Schossburger; 30 May 1910; Budapest, Hungary
- Died: 1 November 1994 (aged 84); Adelaide, South Australia
- Resting place: Centennial Park Cemetery
- Citizenship: Hungarian (1910–1945); Australian (1945–1994)
- Education: Royal Joseph University; University of Adelaide
- Spouse: Márta Svéd
- Children: 2
- Parent(s): Imre and Elsa Schossberger
- Engineering career
- Discipline: Mechanical, civil, and electrical engineering
- Employer: University of Adelaide

George Svéd AM (born György Schossburger; 30 May 1910 – 1 November 1994), was a Hungarian engineer and academic who settled in Australia in 1939 and had a long academic career at the University of Adelaide. He was the husband of mathematician Márta Svéd.

== Early life and education ==
György Schossburger was born in Budapest, Hungary, on 30 May 1910, the eldest of three children of Imre Schossberger, stockbroker, and his wife Elsa (née Grünhut), who were Jewish.

He matriculated from Bolyai High School in 1928, in the same year winning the Eötvös national mathematics competition. He did a four-year course at the Royal Joseph University (in 1949 renamed Technical University of Budapest) which earned him a diploma in mechanical engineering with the highest honours.

After anti-Semitism became fixed in Hungarian policy and law, Jews were restricted from higher education and other areas, György changed his surname to Svéd, which was a Hungarian rather than obviously Jewish surname. He did compulsory military service and then worked as an engineer in a flax-spinning mill. For two years in 1937 and 1938, he worked at the university for associate professor Victor Babits, who afterwards gave him a glowing written reference. He did "radio research work" as well as assisting Babits in his scientific work.

In July 1935 he married mathematician and teacher Márta Wachsberger, who was also Jewish, and the couple made plans to leave Hungary as soon as Austria was incorporated into the German Reich in March 1938.

== Career in Australia ==
The Svéds fled to Australia in early 1939. As his degree was not recognised in Australia, he found it difficult to get work for which he was qualified, so started work at the Holden Woodville Plant in Adelaide, South Australia. As the company started manufacturing watercraft, guns, and torpedoes to supply the Australian Defence Force in World War II, his expertise was valued.

He then undertook the University of Adelaides final year examinations in mechanical and electrical engineering in 1941 without attending any lectures (although he only awarded a bachelor of engineering ad eundem gradum in 1968). In 1943 Walter Schneider, a lecturer in mechanical engineering, invited Svéd to undertake a six-month secondment working with him on a project for the Army Inventions Directorate.

After becoming an Australian citizen in 1945, Svéd was appointed lecturer at the Australian School of Mines and Industries, which was responsible for instruction in the engineering disciplines at the university, the following year. In 1950 he transferred to a post as senior lecturer at the university. In 1958 he was promoted to reader in civil engineering, and later served as head of department (1967–68, 1972–74) and dean of the faculty (1969–70). He retired in 1975.

Svéd's research output was regarded as valuable. He did a lot of laboratory work and also advocated for the use of computers in solving engineering problems such as the behaviour of materials under stress. He was renowned for his skill in mathematical analysis, and often invited to speak at conferences. He assisted in the design and reconstruction of West Gate Bridge in Melbourne after it collapsed in 1970.

== Recognition and honours ==
In 1975 the Institution of Engineers, Australia asked Svéd to chair its national committee on metal structures.

From 1976 until his death, he was an honorary visiting research fellow at the University of Adelaide.

In 1979 the university awarded him an honorary degree of Doctor of the University.

In 1983 Svéd was awarded the gold diploma by the Technical University of Budapest.

On his 80th birthday (30 May 1990) the University of Adelaide compiled a volume of 32 invited papers and held a symposium in his honour.

Svéd was made a Member of the Order of Australia (AM) on 26 January 1991.

== Personal life, death, and legacy ==
Márta and George Svéd had a son and a daughter. They were lifelong friends with Hungarian mathemeticians George and Esther Szekeres, who also moved to Adelaide, and they shared a flat for three years.

In May 1945 he renounced his Hungarian nationality and became an Australian citizen. At that time, the couple lived on Portrush Road at Toorak Gardens.

Svéd died on 1 November 1994 in the Adelaide suburb of Glen Osmond. His ashes were interred in Centennial Park Cemetery.

The Dr George Sved Prize for Civil Engineering was established at the University of Adelaide by a donation to by friends and family, and Márta bequeathed funds to the University to be added to the fund after her death in 2005. The prize is awarded annually to the candidate who obtained the highest mark in a specific course and is enrolled in a Bachelor of Engineering (Honours)(Civil) degree. The prize is A$5,000 in cash.

The George Sved Stress Analysis Teaching Laboratory was named in his honour in 1998, at a ceremony attended by Márta.
