= Josephine D. Edwards =

Australian mathematician

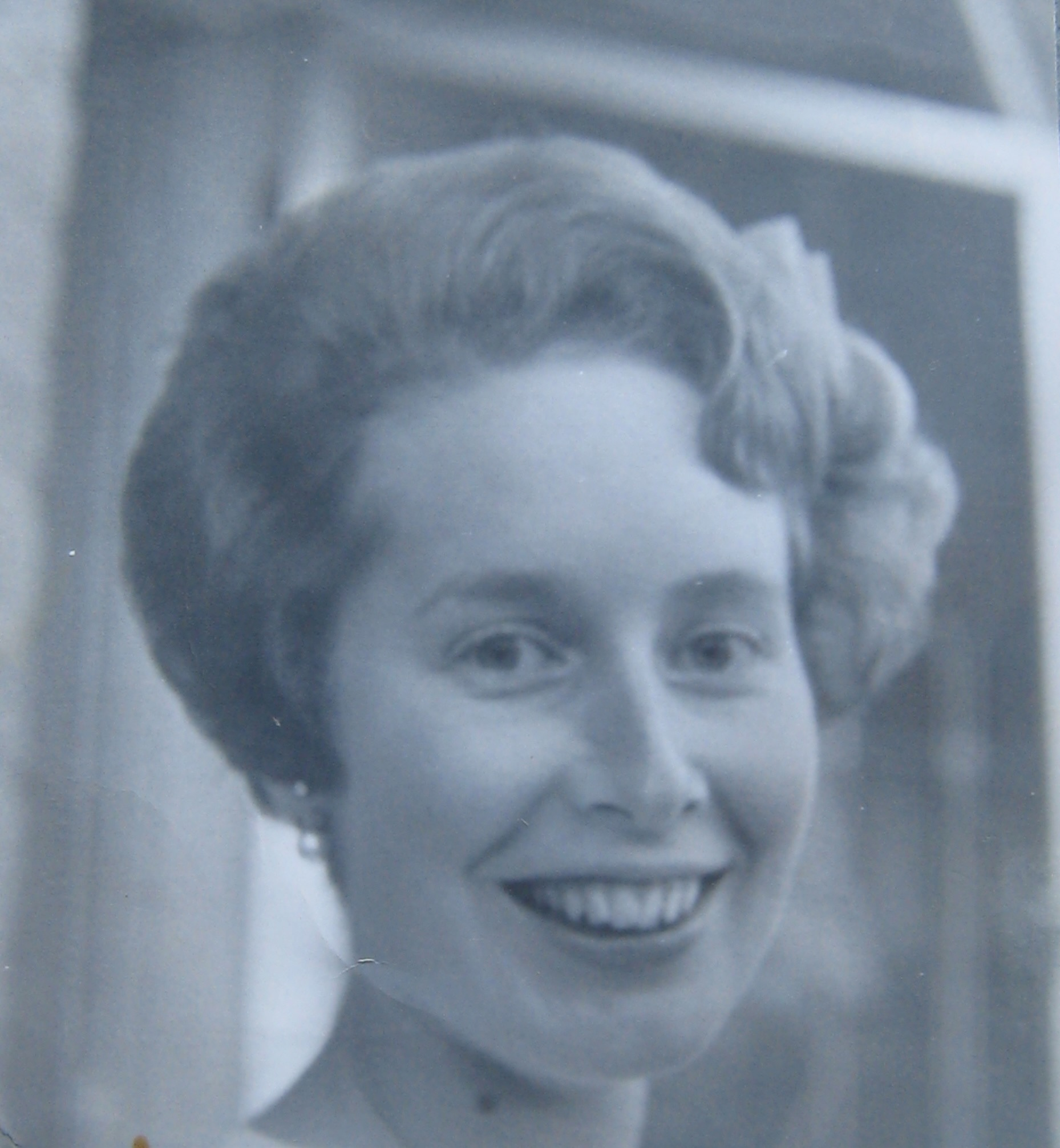
- Born: Josephine Dianne Edwards; 18 August 1942; Oxford, England, United Kingdom
- Died: 25 May 1985 (aged 42); Canberra, Australia
- Education: University of Cambridge
- Known for: Founder of the Australian Mathematics Competition
- Spouses: Paul Frost, Robert A. Edwards, John Pulley
- Awards: BH Neumann Award
- Scientific career
- Fields: Mathematics

Josephine Dianne "Jo" Edwards (18 August 1942 – 25 May 1985) was an Australian mathematician and mathematics educator who co-founded the Australian Mathematics Competition.

== Early life and education ==
Josephine Dianne Edwards was born on 18 August 1942 in Oxford, England.

She was educated at the Ursuline School in Brentwood, and went on to study mathematics at the University of Cambridge.

== Career ==
In 1964, Edwards moved to Canberra, and taught mathematics at secondary schools in the Australian Capital Territory. In 1979, she joined the faculty at the College of Advanced Education in Canberra, later the University of Canberra.

For eighteen years, Edwards was a member of the Canberra Mathematical Association, also serving as its vice-president, president and secretary.

She helped establish and run the Australian Mathematics Competition, serving as chair of its founding committee, as a member of its board of governors from 1977 to 1985 and as editor for its publications from 1979. She was also an associate editor for the American publication The College Mathematics Journal. Her articles on teaching mathematics appeared in journals in Australia, Canada and France.

== Personal life ==
Edwards married Paul Frost, whom she met whilst studying mathematics at the University of Cambridge. The couple migrated to Australia and had two children. After Paul died she married Robert A. Edwards and had a daughter. Later she married John Pulley who at the time had three children from his first marriage.

Edwards died in Canberra on 25 May 1985 at the age of 42.

== Recognition ==
In 1996, Edwards was posthumously awarded a BH Neumann Award.
