= Márta Svéd =

Hungarian mathematician

- Born: Márta Wachsberger; 16 December 1910; Kingdom of Hungary
- Died: 30 September 2005 (aged 94); South Australia
- Citizenship: Hungarian; Australian
- Education: Royal Joseph University; University of Adelaide
- Known for: Journey into Geometries; completing a PhD at age 75
- Spouse: George Svéd
- Children: 2
- Scientific career
- Workplaces: Wilderness School; University of Adelaide
- Thesis: On finite linear and Baer structures (1985)

Márta Svéd (née Wachsberger; 16 December 1910 – 30 September 2005) was a Hungarian mathematician who was a teacher of mathematics at the University of Adelaide after moving to Australia in the 1930s. She was 75 years old when she completed her PhD in 1985. She wrote the textbook Journey into Geometries (1991), and won the BH Neumann Award in 1994 for her contributions to mathematics learning in Australia.

== Early life and education ==
Márta Wachsberger was born in Hungary on 16 December 1910 of Jewish parents.

She was in the same high school class in Budapest as Esther Klein (later Szekeres). She became interested in mathematics through Középiskolai Matematikai Lapok (KöMaL), a Hungarian magazine for high school mathematicians, and through its problem-solving column, where Paul Erdős was also a regular solver. She took third place in her year's offering of the Hungarian national high school mathematics competition, ahead of Pál Turán but behind her future husband, George Svéd. Due to the restrictions placed on Jews in Hungary in the late 1920s, only two students from their class could study science or mathematics at the university in Budapest; Márta took the mathematics position, and Klein studied physics instead.

Both Márta and George Svéd attended the Royal Joseph University in Budapest. They were friends with a group of other young Jewish maths students, including Klein (Márta's best friend from school), her future husband George Szekeres, and Erdős, who used to meet in the Budapest City Park at the Anonymous statue, often discussing mathematical problems.

== Career ==
Svéd and her husband moved to Australia in 1939 and had one son and one daughter. She became the head of the mathematics department at Wilderness School, a private Adelaide high school for girls, and in the same year helped found Australia's first high school mathematics magazine.

Her old friend Klein, meanwhile, had married mathematician George Szekeres and escaped Europe for Shanghai; after World War II, the Szekeres and Svéd families shared a small apartment in Adelaide.

== Awards and honours ==
Svéd won the BH Neumann Award of the Australian Mathematics Trust in 1994. The award citation credited her in particular for the flourishing of mathematics competitions in Australia and the success of Australia in international mathematics competitions.

== Personal life ==
Svéd married engineer George Svéd, and they had a son and a daughter.

== Later life, death and legacy ==
In 1985, Svéd completed a PhD at the University of Adelaide, at age 75. Her dissertation, On finite linear and Baer structures, concerned finite geometry, and was supervised by Rey Casse. Her 1991 book, Journey into Geometries (MAA Spectrum), has been described by reviewer David A. Thomas as an "Alice-in-Wonderland-type journey into non-Euclidean geometry", written in a conversational style.

Svéd died on 30 September 2005, not long after the death of her friends, George and Esther Szekeres, who died within an hour of each other.

Svéd's posthumously-published book Two Lives and a Bonus (Peacock Publications, 2006) documents her early life in Budapest.

The University of Adelaide offers the Márta Svéd Scholarship for women mathematicians.

=== In fiction ===
The Svéds' granddaughter is author Miriam Sved, who moved from Sydney to Melbourne in around 2002. Her fiction has been published in literary journals such as Meanjin and Overland, and as of March 2026 she has published two novels, Game Day (about Aussie rules football), and the historical novel A Universe of Sufficient Size. The latter, which was shortlisted for the Colin Roderick Award, is a story about a group of Jewish mathematicians in Hungary who flee the country, which she based on stories she had heard from Márta Svéd. While the story is fictional, several characters are loosely based on people in Márta Svéd's circle, in particular her mother's best friend from school, Esther Szekeres (née Klein) and her husband George Szekeres, and the famous mathematician Paul Erdős. Erich Mayer, writing in ArtsHub, gave the book 5 out of 5 stars.
