= Journey into Geometries =

1991 book on non-Euclidean geometry

- Author: Márta Svéd
- Illustrator: John Stillwell
- Language: English
- Series: MAA Spectrum
- Subject: non-Euclidean geometry
- Publisher: Mathematical Association of America
- Publication date: 1991
- ISBN: 0-88385-500-3

Journey into Geometries is a book on non-Euclidean geometry. It was written by Hungarian-Australian mathematician Márta Svéd and published in 1991 by the Mathematical Association of America in their MAA Spectrum book series.

== Topics ==
Journey into Geometries is written as a conversation between three characters: Alice, from Alice's Adventures in Wonderland (but older and familiar with Euclidean geometry), Lewis Carroll, the author of Alice's adventures, and a modern mathematician named "Dr. Whatif". Its topics include hyperbolic geometry, inversive geometry, and projective geometry, following an arrangement of these topics credited to Australian mathematician Carl Moppert, and possibly based on an earlier German-language textbook on similar topics by F. Gonseth and P. Marti.

As in Alice's original adventures, the first part of the book is arranged as a travelogue. This part of the book has six chapters, each ending with a set of exercises. Following these chapters, more conventionally written material covers geometric axiom systems and provides solutions to the exercises.

== Audience and reception ==
Reviewer William E. Fenton is unsure of the audience of the book, writing that it is not suitable as a textbook and would scare most undergraduates, but is too unserious for graduate students. David A. Thomas identifies the audience as "people who like to play with mathematical ideas".

Fenton criticizes the book's style as a little too glib and lead-footed, and its illustrations as amateurish. H. W. Guggenheimer faults the treatment of projective geometry as "rather sketchy". Nevertheless, Fenton writes that he found the book engrossing and well-organized, particularly praising its exercises. Both Fenton and Guggenheimer recommend the book to talented students of mathematics, and both Fenton and David A. Thomas suggest it as auxiliary reading for geometry courses.
