= George Szekeres =

Hungarian-Australian mathematician

George Szekeres AM FAA
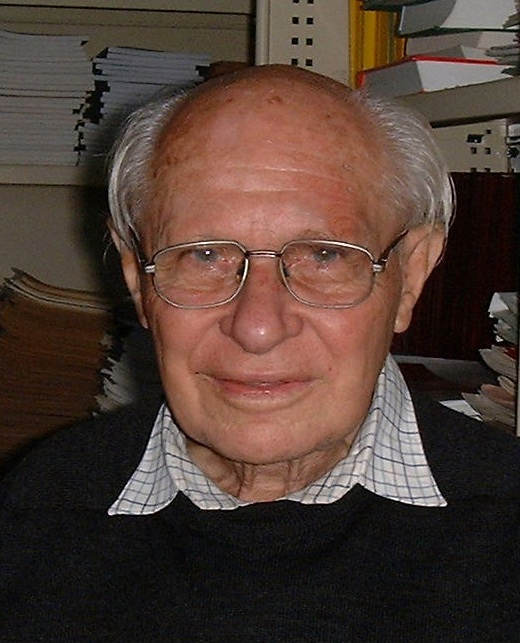
- George Szekeres, 2001
- Born: 29 May 1911; Budapest, Kingdom of Hungary
- Died: 28 August 2005 (aged 94); Adelaide, Australia
- Citizenship: Hungarian, then Australian
- Education: Technical University of Budapest
- Known for: Szekeres snark Kruskal–Szekeres coordinates Erdős–Szekeres theorem
- Spouse: Esther Szekeres
- Children: 2
- Awards: Thomas Ranken Lyle Medal (1968)
- Scientific career
- Fields: Mathematician
- Workplaces: University of Adelaide; University of New South Wales
- Doctoral students: Alfred van der Poorten

George Szekeres (Hungarian: [ˈsɛkɛrɛʃ]; 29 May 1911 – 28 August 2005), born Szekeres György, was a Hungarian–Australian mathematician. After migrating to Australia after World War II, he worked first for the University of Adelaide, and then the University of New South Wales. He is known for his co-authoring a paper with fellow Hungarian mathematician Paul Erdős known as the "Happy Ending problem", and married mathematician Esther Klein.

== Early years and education ==
Szekeres György was born in Budapest, Hungary, on 29 May 1911.

He received his degree in chemistry at the Royal Joseph University (later Technical University of Budapest). (Note: University name per ADB entry on George Svéd, and corroborated in the article about the university.) He graduated with a degree in chemical engineering in 1933, having studied only one mathematical course, in calculus.

The so-called "Happy Ending problem" is an example of how mathematics pervaded Szekeres's life. During 1933, George and several other students met frequently, often at the Anonymous statue in City Park, to discuss mathematics. At one of these meetings, Esther Klein proposed the problem: "Given five points in the plane in general position, prove that four of them form a convex quadrilateral." After allowing George, Paul Erdős, and the other students to scratch their heads for some time, Esther explained her proof. Subsequently, George and Paul wrote a paper (1935) that generalises this result; it is regarded as one of the foundational works in the field of combinatorial geometry. Erdős dubbed the original problem the "Happy Ending" problem because it resulted in the marriage of George and Esther.

== Career ==
Szekeres worked for six years in Budapest as an analytical chemist, and during this time married Esther Klein in 1937. Being Jewish, the family had to escape from the Nazi persecution so Szekeres took a job as a leather chemist in Shanghai, China. There they lived through World War II, the Japanese occupation and the beginnings of the Communist revolution.

In 1948, Szekeres was offered and accepted a position as lecturer at the University of Adelaide, Australia, and the family (with their son, born in China), moving to Adelaide, South Australia, in June 1948. Esther also taught at the university.

In 1964, the family moved to Sydney, where Szekeres took a position as professor of mathematics at the University of New South Wales (UNSW), and taught there until his retirement in 1976, when he became emeritus professor. He continued to publish papers after his retirement.

In 1978 he published a joint paper with Erdős entitled "Some number theoretic problems on binomial coefficients". His 1985 paper "Distribution of labelled trees by diameter" analysed the graphs described by the title and, among many other results, found the expected value of the diameter of a random labelled tree on nn vertices. Also in 1985 he showed his continuing interest in using computers in mathematical investigations with "Computer examination of the two-dimensional simultaneous approximation constant".

He worked closely with many prominent mathematicians throughout his life, including Erdős, his wife Esther, Pál Turán, Béla Bollobás, Ronald Graham, Alf van der Poorten, Miklós Laczkovich, and John Coates. He worked on many problems and published many papers, especially in the field of combinatorics, graph theory in particular. Many mathematical concepts bear his name, including Szekeres snark, Kruskal–Szekeres coordinates, Szekeres–Wilf number, and the Erdős–Szekeres theorem.

== Other activities ==
Szekeres was a founder member of the Australian Mathematical Society in August 1956, and served as its president from 1972 to 1974.

He devised problems for secondary school mathematical olympiads ran by UNSW, and for a yearly undergraduate competition ran by the Sydney University Mathematics Society.

== Recognition and honours ==
- ?: Elected to the Hungarian Academy of Sciences
- 1963: Elected to the Australian Academy of Science
- 1968: Thomas Ranken Lyle Medal of the Australian Academy of Science
- May 2001: festschrift held at UNSW in honour of his ninetieth birthday
- 2001: Australian Centenary Medal, "for service to Australian society and science in pure mathematics"
- 2001: Establishment of the George Szekeres Medal by the Australian Mathematical Society
- 2002: Member of the Order of Australia (AM), "for service to mathematics and science, particularly as a contributor to education and research, to the support and development of the University of New South Wales Mathematics Competition and the Australian Mathematical Olympiad Team"

== Personal life ==
Szkeres married Esther Klein on 13 June 1937.

When they first moved to Australia after the war, the Szekeres shared an apartment in Adelaide with mathematician Márta Svéd, an old school friend of Esther, and her husband George Svéd, for three years. Esther and George had two children. After moving to Sydney, they bought a house in Turramurra, which they had obtained at a low price owing to it having belonged to a person who had died in suspicious circumstances in the Bogle–Chandler case.

Szekeres loved art and music, particularly chamber music. He was an accomplished musician, playing violin and viola. He played in the North Sydney Symphony Orchestra and the Ku-ring-gai Philharmonic Orchestra, and was founding treasurer of the latter until 2000. He also loved walking and even in his 80s enjoyed long walks with his daughter Judith.

After returning to Adelaide in 2004, George and Esther died within an hour of each other on 28 August 2005 in Wynwood Nursing Home in Norwood (now closed).

=== In fiction ===
The Svéds' granddaughter, author Miriam Sved, wrote the historical novel A Universe of Sufficient Size, published in 2019. It tells the story of a group of Jewish mathematicians in Hungary who flee the country, which she based on stories she had heard from Márta Svéd. While the story is fictional, several characters are loosely based on people in Svéd's circle, in particular Esther and George Szekeres, as well as Paul Erdős.

== See also ==
- Powerful number
- Generalized continued fraction
- Schröder's equation
