= Erdős–Szekeres theorem =

Sufficiently long sequences of numbers have long monotonic subsequences

A path of four upward-sloping edges in a set of 17 points. By the Erdős–Szekeres theorem, every set of 17 points has a path of this length that slopes either upward or downward. The 16-point subset with the central point removed has no such path.

In mathematics, the Erdős–Szekeres theorem asserts that, given $r$ and $s$, any sequence of distinct real numbers with length at least $(r-1)(s-1)+1$ contains a monotonically increasing subsequence of length r or a monotonically decreasing subsequence of length s. The proof appeared in the same 1935 paper that mentions the Happy Ending problem.

It is a finitary result that makes precise one of the corollaries of Ramsey's theorem. While Ramsey's theorem makes it easy to prove that every infinite sequence of distinct real numbers contains a monotonically increasing infinite subsequence or a monotonically decreasing infinite subsequence, the result proved by Paul Erdős and George Szekeres goes further.

== Example ==
For r = 3 and s = 2, the formula tells us that any permutation of three numbers has an increasing subsequence of length three or a decreasing subsequence of length two. Among the six permutations of the numbers 1,2,3:

- $\langle1,2,3\rangle$ has an increasing subsequence consisting of all three numbers.
- $\langle1,3,2\rangle$ has a decreasing subsequence $\langle3,2\rangle$
- $\langle2,1,3\rangle$ has a decreasing subsequence $\langle2,1\rangle$
- $\langle2,3,1\rangle$ has two decreasing subsequences, $\langle2,1\rangle$ and $\langle3,1\rangle$
- $\langle3,1,2\rangle$ has two decreasing subsequences, $\langle3,1\rangle$ and $\langle3,2\rangle$
- $\langle3,2,1\rangle$ has three decreasing length-2 subsequences, $\langle3,2\rangle$, $\langle3,1\rangle$ and $\langle2,1\rangle$.

== Alternative interpretations ==
=== Geometric interpretation ===
One can interpret the positions of the numbers in a sequence as x-coordinates of points in the Euclidean plane, and the numbers themselves as y-coordinates; conversely, for any point set in the plane, the y-coordinates of the points, ordered by their x-coordinates, forms a sequence of numbers (unless two of the points have equal x-coordinates). With this translation between sequences and point sets, the Erdős–Szekeres theorem can be interpreted as stating that in any set of at least rs − r − s + 2 points we can find a polygonal path of either r − 1 positive-slope edges or s − 1 negative-slope edges. In particular (taking r = s), in any set of at least n points we can find a polygonal path of at least ⌊√n-1⌋ edges with same-sign slopes. For instance, taking r = s = 5, any set of at least 17 points has a four-edge path in which all slopes have the same sign.

An example of rs − r − s + 1 points without such a path, showing that this bound is tight, can be formed by applying a small rotation to an (r − 1)-by-(s − 1) grid.

=== Permutation pattern interpretation ===
The Erdős–Szekeres theorem may also be interpreted in the language of permutation patterns as stating that every permutation of length at least (r − 1)(s − 1) + 1 must contain the pattern 12⋯r or the pattern s⋯21.

== Proofs ==
The Erdős–Szekeres theorem can be proved in several different ways; Steele (1995) surveys six different proofs of the Erdős–Szekeres theorem, including the following two. Other proofs surveyed by Steele include the original proof by Erdős and Szekeres as well as those of Blackwell (1971), Hammersley (1972), and Lovász (1979).

=== Pigeonhole principle ===
Given a sequence of length (r − 1)(s − 1) + 1, label each number n_{i} in the sequence with the pair (a_{i}, b_{i}), where a_{i} is the length of the longest monotonically increasing subsequence ending with n_{i} and b_{i} is the length of the longest monotonically decreasing subsequence ending with n_{i}. Each two numbers in the sequence are labeled with a different pair: if i < j and n_{i} < n_{j} then a_{i} < a_{j}, and on the other hand if n_{i} > n_{j} then b_{i} < b_{j}. But there are only (r − 1)(s − 1) possible labels if a_{i} is at most r − 1 and b_{i} is at most s − 1, so by the pigeonhole principle there must exist a value of i for which a_{i} or b_{i} is outside this range. If a_{i} is out of range then n_{i} is part of an increasing sequence of length at least r, and if b_{i} is out of range then n_{i} is part of a decreasing sequence of length at least s.

Steele (1995) credits this proof to the one-page paper of Seidenberg (1959) and calls it "the slickest and most systematic" of the proofs he surveys.

=== Dilworth's theorem ===
Another of the proofs uses Dilworth's theorem on chain decompositions in partial orders, or its simpler dual (Mirsky's theorem).

To prove the theorem, define a partial ordering on the members of the sequence, in which x is less than or equal to y in the partial order if x ≤ y as numbers and x is not later than y in the sequence. A chain in this partial order is a monotonically increasing subsequence, and an antichain is a monotonically decreasing subsequence. By Mirsky's theorem, either there is a chain of length r, or the sequence can be partitioned into at most r − 1 antichains; but in that case the largest of the antichains must form a decreasing subsequence with length at least

$$\left\lceil\frac{rs-r-s+2}{r-1}\right\rceil=s.$$

Alternatively, by Dilworth's theorem itself, either there is an antichain of length s, or the sequence can be partitioned into at most s − 1 chains, the longest of which must have length at least r.

=== Application of the Robinson–Schensted correspondence ===
The result can also be obtained as a corollary of the Robinson–Schensted correspondence.

Recall that the Robinson–Schensted correspondence associates to each sequence a Young tableau P whose entries are the values of the sequence. The tableau P has the following properties:

- The length of the longest increasing subsequence is equal to the length of the first row of P.
- The length of the longest decreasing subsequence is equal to the length of the first column of P.

Now, it is not possible to fit (r − 1)(s − 1) + 1 entries in a square box of size (r − 1)(s − 1), so that either the first row is of length at least r or the first column is of length at least s.

== See also ==
- Longest increasing subsequence problem
