= Erzsébet Szekeres =

Hungarian activist and social entrepreneur

Erzsébet Szekeres is a Hungarian disability rights activist and social entrepreneur. She has worked to minister to disabled people of Hungary by "training, employing, and housing disabled adults."

Beginning in the early 1980s, Szekeres began to strive toward greater opportunities for people with disabilities. Her own son, Tibor, had microcephalus and "severe mental retardation." Once Szekeres realized Tibor's chances of survival to adulthood were good, she determined to work toward providing her son and others with disabilities a fulfilling and productive adulthood. Such opportunities for people with disabilities were very rare; according to the Ashoka Innovators for the Public website, "In Hungary, the lack of integration of disabled people into society is extreme. Disabled people...{can not} gain access to public buildings or public transportation....the state solution is institutionalization for life." This state of affairs did not satisfy Szekeres. She began to connect with other parents of disabled children and established an "informal cooperative business running out of her basement." However, such business endeavors were not recognized legally until 1986, when Szekeres founded Összefogás Ipari SzÖvetkezet, or in English, the Alliance Industrial Union. Although progress was slow for a few years, in 1989 the Ministry of Welfare in Hungary awarded substantial funds to the Alliance. This helped to speed up the development of housing as well as facilities and supplies that would enable those with disabilities to earn money. Szekeres has worked to create an environment in which those with disabilities, including her son Tibor, could work and live as unimpeded by their handicaps as possible. According to Szekeres, "...In institutions, you can't leave, you can't be in couples. Here you have a lot of freedom. Here you are challenged to become part of a community." Szekeris was admitted as an Ashoka fellow in 1997 for her entrepreneurial approach to those with disabilities.
