= Panel of Chairs =

Body within the UK House of Commons

The Panel of Chairs (formerly the Chairman's Panel) are members of the House of Commons in the United Kingdom responsible for chairing public bill committees and other General Committees. They may also chair debates in Westminster Hall, the parallel debating chamber. The three Deputy Speakers, who are automatically members, are responsible for chairing Committees of the Whole House. Other members may act as temporary chairs of Committees of the Whole House.

The Panel is chaired by the Chairman of Ways and Means. The Panel is not itself generally thought of as a committee, but it does have the power to meet to consider matters relating to procedure in the general committees and report its findings to the House of Commons.

== Members ==
The panel comprises the Chairman and two Deputy Chairmen of Ways and Means, who are members ex officio, and no fewer than 10 MPs appointed by the Speaker, two of whom are appointed pursuant to section 1(3) of the Parliament Act 1911 by the Committee of Selection to be consulted by the Speaker before declaring a bill to be a money bill.

Members of the Panel of Chairs, as of February 2026:

Member	Party	Constituency	Notes
Nusrat Ghani MP	Conservative	Sussex Weald	Chairman of Ways and Means
Judith Cummins MP	Labour	Bradford South	First Deputy Chairman of Ways and Means
Caroline Nokes MP	Conservative	Romsey and Southampton North	Second Deputy Chairman of Ways and Means
Dr Rosena Allin-Khan MP	Labour	Tooting	
Clive Betts MP	Labour	Sheffield South East	
Dawn Butler MP	Labour Co-operative	Brent East	
Sir Christopher Chope MP	Conservative	Christchurch	
Peter Dowd MP	Labour	Bootle	
Clive Efford MP	Labour	Eltham	
Gill Furniss MP	Labour	Sheffield Brightside and Hillsborough	
Sir Roger Gale MP	Conservative	Herne Bay and Sandwich	
Carolyn Harris MP	Labour	Neath and Swansea East	
Sir John Hayes MP	Conservative	South Holland and the Deepings	
Sir Mark Hendrick MP	Labour Co-operative	Preston	
Wera Hobhouse MP	Liberal Democrats	Bath	
Dr Rupa Huq MP	Labour	Ealing Central and Acton	
Christine Jardine MP	Liberal Democrats	Edinburgh West	
Sir Edward Leigh MP	Conservative	Gainsborough	
Emma Lewell-Buck MP	Labour	South Shields	
Siobhain McDonagh MP	Labour	Mitcham and Morden	
Esther McVey MP	Conservative	Tatton	
David Mundell MP	Conservative	Dumfriesshire, Clydesdale and Tweeddale	
Dr Andrew Murrison MP	Conservative	South West Wiltshire	
Caroline Nokes MP	Conservative	Romsey and Southampton North	
Mark Pritchard MP	Conservative	The Wrekin	
Sir Alec Shelbrooke MP	Conservative	Wetherby and Easingwold	
Graham Stringer MP	Labour	Blackley and Broughton	
Graham Stuart MP	Conservative	Beverley and Holderness	
Sir Desmond Swayne MP	Conservative	New Forest West	
Karl Turner MP	Labour	Kingston upon Hull East	
Derek Twigg MP	Labour	Widnes and Halewood	
Valerie Vaz MP	Labour	Walsall and Bloxwich	
Martin Vickers MP	Conservative	Brigg and Immingham	
Matt Western MP	Labour	Warwick and Leamington	
Sir Jeremy Wright MP	Conservative	Kenilworth and Southam	
