= Esther Szekeres =

Hungarian–Australian mathematician (1910–2005)

- Born: Esther Klein; 20 February 1910; Budapest, Kingdom of Hungary
- Died: 28 August 2005 (aged 95); Adelaide, Australia
- Spouse: George Szekeres
- Children: 2

Academic work
- Institutions: Macquarie University
- Notable ideas: Happy ending problem

Esther Szekeres (Hungarian: Klein Eszter; née Klein; 20 February 1910 – 28 August 2005) was a Hungarian–Australian mathematician.

== Early life and education ==
Esther Klein was born to Ignaz Klein in a Jewish family in Budapest, Kingdom of Hungary, on 20 February 1910. As a young physics student in Budapest, Klein was a member of a group of Hungarians including Paul Erdős, George Szekeres, Pál Turán, and her old schoolfriend Márta Svéd (then Wachsberger), who convened over interesting mathematical problems, often at the Anonymous in Budapest City Park. Klein was known as Epsz by Svéd.

In 1933, Klein proposed to the group a combinatorial problem that Erdős named as the "Happy Ending problem", as it led to her marriage to George Szekeres. Erdős and George Szekeres went on to publish about the problem, but Esther was not mentioned as taking part later.

== Career ==
Following the outbreak of World War II in 1939, Esther and George Szekeres emigrated to Australia after spending the wartime years in Hongkew, a community of refugees located in Shanghai, China, before moving to Australia in 1945. They first lived in Adelaide, South Australia, for three years where they shared a small apartment with Márta and her husband George Svéd, with all of their children, before moving to Sydney in 1964.

In Sydney, Esther lectured at Macquarie University and was actively involved in mathematics enrichment for high-school students. In 1984, she jointly founded a weekly mathematics enrichment meeting that has since expanded into a programme of about 30 groups that continue to meet weekly and inspire high school students throughout Australia and New Zealand.

== Personal life and death ==
Esther married George Szekeres in 1937, and they had two children.

When they first moved to Australia after the war, the Szekeres shared an apartment in Adelaide with mathematician Márta Svéd, an old school friend of Szekeres, and her husband George Svéd, for three years, with their children.

In 2004, she and George moved back to Adelaide, where, on 28 August 2005, she and her husband died within an hour of each other. Esther's friend Márta Svéd died a month later, also in Adelaide.

=== In fiction ===
The Svéds' granddaughter, author Miriam Sved, wrote the historical novel A Universe of Sufficient Size, published in 2019. It tells the story of a group of Jewish mathematicians in Hungary who flee the country, which she based on stories she had heard from Márta Svéd. While the story is fictional, several characters are loosely based on people in Svéd's circle, in particular Esther and George Szekeres, as well as Paul Erdős.

== Recognition ==
In 1990, Macquarie University gave Szekeres an honorary doctorate.

In 1993, she was the recipient of a BH Neumann Award of the Australian Mathematics Trust.
