= Graded poset =

Partially ordered set equipped with a rank function

A power set, partially ordered by inclusion, with rank defined as number of elements, forms a graded poset.

In mathematics, in the branch of combinatorics, a graded poset is a partially-ordered set (poset) P equipped with a rank function ρ from P to the set N of all natural numbers. ρ must satisfy the following two properties:

- The rank function is compatible with the ordering, meaning that for all x and y in the order, if x < y then ρ(x) < ρ(y), and
- The rank is consistent with the covering relation of the ordering, meaning that for all x and y, if y covers x then ρ(y) = ρ(x) + 1.

The value of the rank function for an element of the poset is called its rank. Sometimes a graded poset is called a ranked poset but that phrase has other meanings; see Ranked poset. A rank or rank level of a graded poset is the subset of all the elements of the poset that have a given rank value.

Graded posets play an important role in combinatorics and can be visualized by means of a Hasse diagram.

== Examples ==
Some examples of graded posets (with the rank function in parentheses) are:

- Natural numbers N with their usual order (rank: the number itself), or some interval [0, N] of this poset
- N^{n} with the product order (sum of the components), or a subposet of it that is a product of intervals
- Positive integers ordered by divisibility (number of prime factors, counted with multiplicity), or a subposet of it formed by the divisors of a fixed N
- The Boolean lattice of finite subsets of a set ordered by inclusion (number of elements of the subset)
- Any distributive lattice of finite lower sets of another poset (number of elements)
  - In particular any finite distributive lattice
- Poset of all unlabeled posets on $\{1,...,n\}$ (number of elements)
- Young's lattice (number of boxes in the Young diagram)
- Any geometric lattice, such as the lattice of subspaces of a vector space (dimension of the subspace)
- Lattice of partitions of a set into finitely many parts, ordered by reverse refinement (number of parts)
- Lattice of partitions of a finite set X, ordered by refinement (number of elements of X minus number of parts)
- Face lattice of convex polytopes (dimension of the face, plus one)
- Abstract polytope ("distance" from the least face, minus one)
- Abstract simplicial complex (number of elements of the simplex)
- A group with a generating set, or equivalently its Cayley graph, ordered by the weak or strong Bruhat order, and ranked by word length (length of shortest reduced word)
  - In particular a Coxeter group, for example permutations of a totally ordered n-element set, with either the weak or strong Bruhat order (number of adjacent inversions)

== Alternative characterizations ==
The lattice N_{5} can't be graded.

A bounded poset admits a grading if and only if all maximal chains in P have the same length: setting the rank of the least element to 0 then determines the rank function completely. This covers many finite cases of interest; see picture for a negative example. However, unbounded posets can be more complicated.

A candidate rank function, compatible with the ordering, makes a poset into graded poset if and only if, whenever one has x < z with z of rank n + 1, an element y of rank n can be found with x ≤ y < z. This condition is sufficient because if z is taken to be a cover of x, the only possible choice is y = x showing that the ranks of x and z differ by 1, and it is necessary because in a graded poset one can take for y any element of maximal rank with x ≤ y < z, which always exists and is covered by z.

Often a poset comes with a natural candidate for a rank function; for instance if its elements are finite subsets of some base set B, one can take the number of elements of those subsets. Then the criterion just given can be more practical than the definition because it avoids mention of covers. For instance if B is itself a poset, and P consists of its finite lower sets (subsets for which with every one of its elements, all smaller elements are also in the subset), then the criterion is automatically satisfied, since for lower sets x ⊊ z there is always a maximal element of z that is absent from x, and it can be removed from z to form y.

In some common posets such as the face lattice of a convex polytope there is a natural grading by dimension, which if used as rank function would give the minimal element, the empty face, rank −1. In such cases it might be convenient to bend the definition stated above by adjoining the value −1 to the set of values allowed for the rank function. Allowing arbitrary integers as rank would however give a fundamentally different notion; for instance the existence of a minimal element would no longer be assured.

A graded poset (with positive integer ranks) cannot have any elements x for which arbitrarily long chains with greatest element x exist, as otherwise it would have to have elements of arbitrarily small (and eventually negative) rank. For instance, the integers (with the usual order) cannot be a graded poset, nor can any interval (with more than one element) of rational or real numbers. (In particular, graded posets are well-founded, meaning that they satisfy the descending chain condition (DCC): they do not contain any infinite descending chains.) Henceforth we shall therefore only consider posets in which this does not happen. This implies that whenever x < y we can get from x to y by repeatedly choosing a cover, finitely many times. It also means that (for positive integer rank functions) compatibility of ρ with the ordering follows from the requirement about covers. As a variant of the definition of a graded poset, Birkhoff allows rank functions to have arbitrary (rather than only nonnegative) integer values. In this variant, the integers can be graded (by the identity function) in his setting, and the compatibility of ranks with the ordering is not redundant. As a third variant, Brightwell and West define a rank function to be integer-valued, but don't require its compatibility with the ordering; hence this variant can grade even e.g. the real numbers by any function, as the requirement about covers is vacuous for this example.

Note that graded posets need not satisfy the ascending chain condition (ACC): for instance, the natural numbers contain the infinite ascending chain $0 < 1 < 2 < \dots$.

A poset is graded if and only if every connected component of its comparability graph is graded, so further characterizations will suppose this comparability graph to be connected. On each connected component the rank function is only unique up to a uniform shift (so the rank function can always be chosen so that the elements of minimal rank in their connected component have rank 0).

If P has a least element Ô then being graded is equivalent to the condition that for any element x all maximal chains in the interval [Ô, x] have the same length. This condition is necessary since every step in a maximal chain is a covering relation, which should change the rank by 1. The condition is also sufficient, since when it holds, one can use the mentioned length to define the rank of x (the length of a finite chain is its number of "steps", so one less than its number of elements), and whenever x covers y, adjoining x to a maximal chain in [Ô, y] gives a maximal chain in [Ô, x].

If P also has a greatest element Î (so that it is a bounded poset), then the previous condition can be simplified to the requirement that all maximal chains in P have the same (finite) length. This suffices, since any pair of maximal chains in [Ô, x] can be extended by a maximal chain in [x, Î] to give a pair of maximal chains in P.

Note Stanley defines a poset to be graded of length n if all its maximal chains have length n (Stanley 1997, p.99). This definition is given in a context where interest is mostly in finite posets, and although the book subsequently often drops the part "of length n", it does not seem appropriate to use this as definition of "graded" for general posets, because (1) it says nothing about posets whose maximal chains are infinite, in particular (2) it excludes important posets like Young's lattice. Also it is not clear why in a graded poset all minimal elements, as well as all maximal elements, should be required to have the same length, even if Stanley gives examples making clear that he does mean to require that (ibid, pp.216 and 219).

== The usual case ==
Many authors in combinatorics define graded posets in such a way that all minimal elements of P must have rank 0, and moreover that there is a maximal rank r that is the rank of any maximal element. Then being graded means that all maximal chains have length r, as is indicated above. In this case one says that P has rank r.

Furthermore, in this case, to the rank levels are associated the rank numbers or Whitney numbers $W_0,W_1,W_2,...$. These numbers are defined by $W_i$ = number of elements of P having rank i .

The Whitney numbers are connected with a lot of important combinatorial theorems. The classic example is Sperner's theorem, which can be formulated as follows:

For the power set $\mathcal P(S)$ of every finite set $S$ the maximum cardinality of a Sperner family equals the maximum Whitney number.

This means:

Every finite power set has the Sperner property

== See also ==
- Graded (mathematics)
- Prewellordering – a prewellordering with a norm is analogous to a graded poset, replacing a map to the integers with a map to the ordinals
- Star product, a method for combining two graded posets
