= Sperner property =

Sperner property may refer to:

- the defining property for a Sperner family, a family of sets in which no set is a subset of another
- Sperner property of a partially ordered set, a ranked partially ordered set in which one of the rank levels is a maximum antichain
