= Leon Mirsky =

Russian-British mathematician

- Born: 19 December 1918; Russia
- Died: 1 December 1983 (aged 64); Sheffield, England
- Education: University of Sheffield; King's College, London
- Known for: Mirsky's theorem Mirsky–Newman theorem
- Scientific career
- Fields: Mathematics
- Workplaces: University of Sheffield

Leonid Mirsky (19 December 1918 – 1 December 1983) was a Russian-British mathematician who worked in number theory, linear algebra, and combinatorics. Mirsky's theorem is named after him.

== Biography ==
Mirsky was born in Russia on 19 December 1918 to a medical family, but his parents sent him to live with his aunt and uncle, a wool merchant in Germany, when he was eight. His uncle's family moved to Bradford, England in 1933, bringing Mirsky with them. He studied at Herne Bay High School and King's College, London, graduating in 1940. Because of the evacuation of London during the Blitz, students at King's College were moved to Bristol University, where Mirsky earned a master's degree. He took a short-term faculty position at Sheffield University in 1942, and then a similar position in Manchester; he returned to Sheffield in 1945, where (except for a term as visiting faculty at Bristol) he would stay for the rest of his career. He became a lecturer in 1947, earned a Ph.D. from Sheffield in 1949, became senior lecturer in 1958, reader in 1961, and was given a personal chair in 1971.

In 1953 Mirsky married Aileen Guilding who was, at that time, a lecturer in Biblical History and Literature at Sheffield but later became a professor and Head of Department.

He retired in September 1983, and died on 1 December 1983.

Mirsky was an editor of the Journal of Linear Algebra and its Applications, the Journal of Mathematical Analysis and Applications, and Mathematical Spectrum.

== Research ==
=== Number theory ===
Mirsky's early research concerned number theory. He was particularly interested in the r-free numbers, a generalization of the square-free integers consisting of the numbers not divisible by any rth power. These numbers are a superset of the prime numbers, and Mirsky proved theorems for them analogous to Vinogradov's theorem, Goldbach's conjecture, and the twin prime conjecture for prime numbers.

With Paul Erdős in 1952, Mirsky proved strong asymptotic bounds on the number of distinct values taken by the divisor function d(n) counting the number of divisors of the number n. If D(n) denotes the number of distinct values of d(m) for m ≤ n, then

$$D(n) = \exp\left(\bigl(1+o(1)\bigr)\frac{\pi\sqrt{8\log n}}{\sqrt{3}\log\log n}\right).$$

The Mirsky–Newman theorem concerns partitions of the integers into arithmetic progressions, and states that any such partition must have two progressions with the same difference. That is, there cannot be a covering system that covers every integer exactly once and has distinct differences. This result is a special case of the Herzog–Schönheim conjecture in group theory; it was conjectured in 1950 by Paul Erdős and proved soon thereafter by Mirsky and Donald J. Newman. However, Mirsky and Newman never published their proof. The same proof was also found independently by Harold Davenport and Richard Rado.

=== Linear algebra ===
In 1947, Mirsky was asked to teach a course in linear algebra. He soon after wrote a textbook on the subject, An introduction to linear algebra (Oxford University Press, 1955), as well as writing a number of research papers on the subject.

In his research, Mirsky provided necessary and sufficient conditions for the existence of matrices of various types (real symmetric matrices, orthogonal matrices, Hermitian matrices, etc.) with specified diagonal elements and specified eigenvalues.

He obtained a tightening of the Birkhoff–von Neumann theorem with H. K. Farahat stating that every doubly stochastic matrix can be obtained as a convex combination of permutation matrices. In Mirsky's version of this theorem, he showed that at most $n^2-2n+2$ permutation matrices are needed to represent every $n\times n$ doubly stochastic matrix, and that some doubly stochastic matrices need this many permutation matrices. In modern polyhedral combinatorics, this result can be seen as a special case of Carathéodory's theorem applied to the Birkhoff polytope. He also worked with Hazel Perfect on the spectra of doubly stochastic matrices.

=== Combinatorics ===
In the mid 1960s, Mirsky's research focus shifted again, to combinatorics, after using Hall's marriage theorem in connection with his work on doubly stochastic matrices. In this area, he wrote the textbook Transversal Theory (Academic Press, 1971), at the same time editing a festschrift for Richard Rado. He derived conditions for pairs of set families to have simultaneous transversals, closely related to later work on network flow problems. He also was one of the first to recognize the importance of transversal matroids, and he showed that transversal matroids can be represented using linear algebra over transcendental extensions of the rational numbers.

Mirsky's theorem, a dual version of Dilworth's theorem published by Mirsky in 1971, states that in any finite partially ordered set the size of the longest chain equals the smallest number of antichains into which the set may be partitioned. Although much easier to prove than Dilworth's theorem, it has many of the same consequences.
