= Mirsky =

Mirsky is a surname. Notable people with the surname include:

- Alexander Mirsky (born 1964), Latvian politician
- Alfred Mirsky (1900–1974), American molecular biologist
- Boris Mirkin-Getzevich (1892–1955), better known by his pen name Boris Mirsky
- D. S. Mirsky (1890–1939), Russian historian and critic
- Eytan Mirsky (born 1961), American singer-songwriter
- Jeannette Mirsky (1903–1987), American writer
- Jonathan Mirsky (1932–2021), American journalist and historian of China
- Leon Mirsky (1918–1983), Russian-British mathematician
- Mark Jay Mirsky (born 1939), American novelist
- Steve Mirsky, American journalist

== Other ==
- Mirsky's theorem
- Mirsky's Worst of the Web
- Boris Mirski Gallery

== See also ==
- Mirskis, a surname
- Svyatopolk-Mirsky
