= Integer function =

Integer function may refer to:

- Integer-valued function, an integer function
- Floor function, sometimes referred as the integer function, INT
- Arithmetic function, a term for some functions of an integer variable

== See also ==
- Integer
- Function (mathematics)
- Integer (computer science)
