= Emanuel Sperner =

German mathematician (1905–1980)

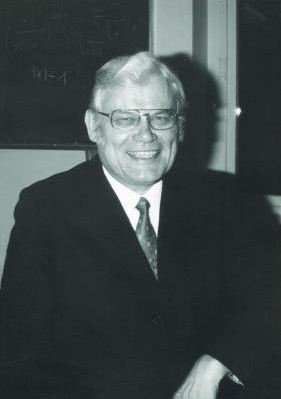
- Born: 9 December 1905; Waltdorf, Upper Silesia, German Empire (now in Poland)
- Died: 17 March 1980 (aged 74); Sulzburg-Laufen, Germany
- Education: University of Hamburg
- Known for: Sperner's theorem Sperner's lemma
- Scientific career
- Fields: Mathematics
- Workplaces: University of Königsberg; University of Bonn; University of Freiburg; University of Hamburg
- Doctoral advisor: Wilhelm Blaschke
- Doctoral students: Kurt Leichtweiss; Gerhard Ringel

Emanuel Sperner (9 December 1905 – 31 January 1980) was a German mathematician, best known for two theorems. He was born in Waltdorf (near Neiße, Upper Silesia, now Nysa, Poland), and died in Sulzburg-Laufen, West Germany. He was a student at Carolinum in Nysa and then Hamburg University where his advisor was Wilhelm Blaschke. He was appointed Professor in Königsberg in 1934, and subsequently held posts in a number of universities until 1974.

Sperner's theorem, from 1928, says that the size of an antichain in the power set of an n-set (a Sperner family) is at most the middle binomial coefficient(s). It has several proofs and numerous generalizations, including the Sperner property of a partially ordered set.

Sperner's lemma, from 1928, states that every Sperner coloring of a triangulation of an n-dimensional simplex contains a cell colored with a complete set of colors. It was proven by Sperner to provide an alternate proof of a theorem of Lebesgue characterizing dimensionality of Euclidean spaces. It was later noticed that this lemma provides a direct proof of the Brouwer fixed-point theorem without explicit use of homology.

Sperner's students included Kurt Leichtweiss and Gerhard Ringel.
