= Complete residue system =

Complete residue system may refer to:

- Covering system
- Complete residue system modulo m
