= Ranked poset =

Partially ordered set in Mathematics

In mathematics, a ranked poset is a partially ordered set in which one of the following (non-equivalent) conditions hold: it is

- a graded poset, or
- a poset with the property that for every element x, all maximal chains among those with x as greatest element have the same finite length, or
- a poset in which all maximal chains have the same finite length.

The second definition differs from the first in that it requires all minimal elements to have the same rank; for posets with a least element, however, the two requirements are equivalent. The third definition is even more strict in that it excludes posets with infinite chains and also requires all maximal elements to have the same rank. Richard P. Stanley defines a graded poset of length n as one in which all maximal chains have length n.
