= Curtis Greene =

American mathematician

Curtis Greene is an American mathematician, specializing in algebraic combinatorics. He is the J. McLain King Professor of Mathematics at Haverford College in Pennsylvania.

Greene did his undergraduate studies at Harvard University, and earned his Ph.D. in 1969 from the California Institute of Technology under the supervision of Robert P. Dilworth. He held positions at the Massachusetts Institute of Technology and the University of Pennsylvania before moving to Haverford.

Greene has written highly cited research papers on Sperner families, Young tableaux, and combinatorial equivalences between hyperplane arrangements, zonotopes, and graph orientations. With Daniel Kleitman, he has also written a highly cited survey paper on combinatorial proof techniques.

In 2012 he became a fellow of the American Mathematical Society.
