= Glossary of order theory =

Glossary of terms used in branch of mathematics

This is a glossary of some terms used in various branches of mathematics that are related to the fields of order, lattice, and domain theory. Note that there is a structured list of order topics available as well. Other helpful resources might be the following overview articles:

- completeness properties of partial orders
- distributivity laws of order theory

In the following, partial orders will usually just be denoted by their carrier sets. As long as the intended meaning is clear from the context, $\,\leq\,$ will suffice to denote the corresponding relational symbol, even without prior introduction. Furthermore, < will denote the strict order induced by $\,\leq.$

== A ==
- Acyclic. A binary relation is acyclic if it contains no "cycles": equivalently, its transitive closure is antisymmetric.
- Adjoint. See Galois connection.
- Alexandrov topology. For a preordered set P, any upper set O is Alexandrov-open. Inversely, a topology is Alexandrov if any intersection of open sets is open.
- Algebraic poset. A poset is algebraic if it has a base of compact elements.
- Antichain. An antichain is a poset in which no two elements are comparable, i.e., there are no two distinct elements x and y such that x ≤ y. In other words, the order relation of an antichain is just the identity relation.
- Approximates relation. See way-below relation.
- Antisymmetric relation. A homogeneous relation R on a set X is antisymmetric, if x R y and y R x implies x = y, for all elements x, y in X.
- Antitone. An antitone function f between posets P and Q is a function for which, for all elements x, y of P, x ≤ y (in P) implies f(y) ≤ f(x) (in Q). Another name for this property is order-reversing. In analysis, in the presence of total orders, such functions are often called monotonically decreasing, but this is not a very convenient description when dealing with non-total orders. The dual notion is called monotone or order-preserving.
- Asymmetric relation. A homogeneous relation R on a set X is asymmetric, if x R y implies not y R x, for all elements x, y in X.
- Atom. An atom in a poset P with least element 0, is an element that is minimal among all elements that are unequal to 0.
- Atomic. An atomic poset P with least element 0 is one in which, for every non-zero element x of P, there is an atom a of P with a ≤ x.

== B ==
- Base. See continuous poset.
- Binary relation. A binary relation over two sets $X \text{ and } Y$ is a subset of their Cartesian product $X \times Y.$
- Boolean algebra. A Boolean algebra is a distributive lattice with least element 0 and greatest element 1, in which every element x has a complement ¬x, such that x ∧ ¬x = 0 and x ∨ ¬x = 1.
- Bounded poset. A bounded poset is one that has a least element and a greatest element.
- Bounded complete. A poset is bounded complete if every of its subsets with some upper bound also has a least such upper bound. The dual notion is not common.

== C ==
- Chain. A chain is a totally ordered set or a totally ordered subset of a poset. See also total order.
- Chain complete. A partially ordered set in which every chain has a least upper bound.
- Closure operator. A closure operator on the poset P is a function C : P → P that is monotone, idempotent, and satisfies C(x) ≥ x for all x in P.
- Compact. An element x of a poset is compact if it is way below itself, i.e. x<<x. One also says that such an x is finite.
- Comparable. Two elements x and y of a poset P are comparable if either x ≤ y or y ≤ x.
- Comparability graph. The comparability graph of a poset (P, ≤) is the graph with vertex set P in which the edges are those pairs of distinct elements of P that are comparable under ≤ (and, in particular, under its reflexive reduction <).
- Complete Boolean algebra. A Boolean algebra that is a complete lattice.
- Complete Heyting algebra. A Heyting algebra that is a complete lattice is called a complete Heyting algebra. This notion coincides with the concepts frame and locale.
- Complete lattice. A complete lattice is a poset in which arbitrary (possibly infinite) joins (suprema) and meets (infima) exist.
- Complete partial order. A complete partial order, or cpo, is a directed complete partial order (q.v.) with least element.
- Complete relation. Synonym for Connected relation.
- Complete semilattice. The notion of a complete semilattice is defined in different ways. As explained in the article on completeness (order theory), any poset for which either all suprema or all infima exist is already a complete lattice. Hence the notion of a complete semilattice is sometimes used to coincide with the one of a complete lattice. In other cases, complete (meet-) semilattices are defined to be bounded complete cpos, which is arguably the most complete class of posets that are not already complete lattices.
- Completely distributive lattice. A complete lattice is completely distributive if arbitrary joins distribute over arbitrary meets.
- Completion. A completion of a poset is an order-embedding of the poset in a complete lattice.
- Completion by cuts. Synonym of Dedekind–MacNeille completion.
- Connected relation. A total or complete relation R on a set X has the property that for all elements x, y of X, at least one of x R y or y R x holds.
- Continuous poset. A poset is continuous if it has a base, i.e. a subset B of P such that every element x of P is the supremum of a directed set contained in {y in B | y<<x}.
- Continuous function. See Scott-continuous.
- Converse. The converse <° of an order < is that in which x <° y whenever y < x.
- Cover. An element y of a poset P is said to cover an element x of P (and is called a cover of x) if x < y and there is no element z of P such that x < z < y.
- cpo. See complete partial order.

== D ==
- dcpo. See directed complete partial order.
- Dedekind–MacNeille completion. The Dedekind–MacNeille completion of a partially ordered set is the smallest complete lattice that contains it.
- Dense order. A dense poset P is one in which, for all elements x and y in P with x < y, there is an element z in P, such that x < z < y. A subset Q of P is dense in P if for any elements x < y in P, there is an element z in Q such that x < z < y.
- Derangement. A permutation of the elements of a set, such that no element appears in its original position.
- Directed set. A non-empty subset X of a poset P is called directed, if, for all elements x and y of X, there is an element z of X such that x ≤ z and y ≤ z. The dual notion is called filtered.
- Directed complete partial order. A poset D is said to be a directed complete poset, or dcpo, if every directed subset of D has a supremum.
- Distributive. A lattice L is called distributive if, for all x, y, and z in L, we find that x ∧ (y ∨ z) = (x ∧ y) ∨ (x ∧ z). This condition is known to be equivalent to its order dual. A meet-semilattice is distributive if for all elements a, b and x, a ∧ b ≤ x implies the existence of elements a' ≥ a and b' ≥ b such that a' ∧ b' = x. See also completely distributive.
- Domain. Domain is a general term for objects like those that are studied in domain theory. If used, it requires further definition.
- Down-set. See lower set.
- Dual. For a poset (P, ≤), the dual order P^{d} = (P, ≥) is defined by setting x ≥ y if and only if y ≤ x. The dual order of P is sometimes denoted by P^{op}, and is also called opposite or converse order. Any order theoretic notion induces a dual notion, defined by applying the original statement to the order dual of a given set. This exchanges ≤ and ≥, meets and joins, zero and unit.

== E ==
- Extension. For partial orders ≤ and ≤′ on a set X, ≤′ is an extension of ≤ provided that for all elements x and y of X, x ≤ y implies that x ≤′ y.

== F ==
- Filter. A subset X of a poset P is called a filter if it is a filtered upper set. The dual notion is called ideal.
- Filtered. A non-empty subset X of a poset P is called filtered, if, for all elements x and y of X, there is an element z of X such that z ≤ x and z ≤ y. The dual notion is called directed.
- Finite element. See compact.
- Frame. A frame F is a complete lattice, in which, for every x in F and every subset Y of F, the infinite distributive law x ∧ $\bigvee$Y = $\bigvee${x ∧ y | y in Y} holds. Frames are also known as locales and as complete Heyting algebras.

== G ==
- Galois connection. Given two posets P and Q, a pair of monotone functions F:P → Q and G:Q → P is called a Galois connection, if F(x) ≤ y is equivalent to x ≤ G(y), for all x in P and y in Q. F is called the lower adjoint of G and G is called the upper adjoint of F.
- Greatest element. For a subset X of a poset P, an element a of X is called the greatest element of X, if x ≤ a for every element x in X. The dual notion is called least element.
- Ground set. The ground set of a poset (X, ≤) is the set X on which the partial order ≤ is defined.

== H ==
- Heyting algebra. A Heyting algebra H is a bounded lattice in which the function f_{a}: H → H, given by f_{a}(x) = a ∧ x is the lower adjoint of a Galois connection, for every element a of H. The upper adjoint of f_{a} is then denoted by g_{a}, with g_{a}(x) = a ⇒; x. Every Boolean algebra is a Heyting algebra.
- Hasse diagram. A Hasse diagram is a type of mathematical diagram used to represent a finite partially ordered set, in the form of a drawing of its transitive reduction.
- Homogeneous relation. A homogeneous relation on a set $X$ is a subset of $X \times X.$ Said differently, it is a binary relation over $X$ and itself.

== I ==
- Ideal. An ideal is a subset X of a poset P that is a directed lower set. The dual notion is called filter.
- Incidence algebra. The incidence algebra of a poset is the associative algebra of all scalar-valued functions on intervals, with addition and scalar multiplication defined pointwise, and multiplication defined as a certain convolution; see incidence algebra for the details.
- Infimum. For a poset P and a subset X of P, the greatest element in the set of lower bounds of X (if it exists, which it may not) is called the infimum, meet, or greatest lower bound of X. It is denoted by inf X or $\bigwedge$X. The infimum of two elements may be written as inf{x,y} or x ∧ y. If the set X is finite, one speaks of a finite infimum. The dual notion is called supremum.
- Interval. For two elements a, b of a partially ordered set P, the interval [a,b] is the subset {x in P | a ≤ x ≤ b} of P. If a ≤ b does not hold the interval will be empty.
- Interval finite poset. A partially ordered set P is interval finite if every interval of the form {x in P | x ≤ a} is a finite set.
- Inverse. See converse.
- Irreflexive. A relation R on a set X is irreflexive, if there is no element x in X such that x R x.
- Isotone. See monotone.

== J ==
- Join. See supremum.

== L ==
- Lattice. A lattice is a poset in which all non-empty finite joins (suprema) and meets (infima) exist.
- Least element. For a subset X of a poset P, an element a of X is called the least element of X, if a ≤ x for every element x in X. The dual notion is called greatest element.
- The length of a chain is the number of elements less one. A chain with 1 element has length 0, one with 2 elements has length 1, etc.
- Linear. See total order.
- Linear extension. A linear extension of a partial order is an extension that is a linear order, or total order.
- Locale. A locale is a complete Heyting algebra. Locales are also called frames and appear in Stone duality and pointless topology.
- Locally finite poset. A partially ordered set P is locally finite if every interval [a, b] = {x in P | a ≤ x ≤ b} is a finite set.
- Lower bound. A lower bound of a subset X of a poset P is an element b of P, such that b ≤ x, for all x in X. The dual notion is called upper bound.
- Lower set. A subset X of a poset P is called a lower set if, for all elements x in X and p in P, p ≤ x implies that p is contained in X. The dual notion is called upper set.

== M ==
- Maximal chain. A chain in a poset to which no element can be added without losing the property of being totally ordered. This is stronger than being a saturated chain, as it also excludes the existence of elements either less than all elements of the chain or greater than all its elements. A finite saturated chain is maximal if and only if it contains both a minimal and a maximal element of the poset.
- Maximal element. A maximal element of a subset X of a poset P is an element m of X, such that m ≤ x implies m = x, for all x in X. The dual notion is called minimal element.
- Maximum element. Synonym of greatest element. For a subset X of a poset P, an element a of X is called the maximum element of X if x ≤ a for every element x in X. A maximum element is necessarily maximal, but the converse need not hold.
- Meet. See infimum.
- Minimal element. A minimal element of a subset X of a poset P is an element m of X, such that x ≤ m implies m = x, for all x in X. The dual notion is called maximal element.
- Minimum element. Synonym of least element. For a subset X of a poset P, an element a of X is called the minimum element of X if x ≥ a for every element x in X. A minimum element is necessarily minimal, but the converse need not hold.
- Monotone. A function f between posets P and Q is monotone if, for all elements x, y of P, x ≤ y (in P) implies f(x) ≤ f(y) (in Q). Other names for this property are isotone and order-preserving. In analysis, in the presence of total orders, such functions are often called monotonically increasing, but this is not a very convenient description when dealing with non-total orders. The dual notion is called antitone or order reversing.

== O ==
- Order-dual. The order dual of a partially ordered set is the same set with the partial order relation replaced by its converse.
- Order-embedding. A function f between posets P and Q is an order-embedding if, for all elements x, y of P, x ≤ y (in P) is equivalent to f(x) ≤ f(y) (in Q).
- Order isomorphism. A mapping f: P → Q between two posets P and Q is called an order isomorphism, if it is bijective and both f and f^{−1} are monotone functions. Equivalently, an order isomorphism is a surjective order embedding.
- Order-preserving. See monotone.
- Order-reversing. See antitone.

== P ==
- Partial order. A partial order is a binary relation that is reflexive, antisymmetric, and transitive. In a slight abuse of terminology, the term is sometimes also used to refer not to such a relation, but to its corresponding partially ordered set.
- Partially ordered set. A partially ordered set $(P, \leq),$ or poset for short, is a set $P$ together with a partial order $\,\leq\,$ on $P.$
- Poset. A partially ordered set.
- Preorder. A preorder is a binary relation that is reflexive and transitive. Such orders may also be called quasiorders or non-strict preorder. The term preorder is also used to denote an acyclic binary relation (also called an acyclic digraph).
- Preordered set. A preordered set $(P, \leq)$ is a set $P$ together with a preorder $\,\leq\,$ on $P.$
- Preserving. A function f between posets P and Q is said to preserve suprema (joins), if, for all subsets X of P that have a supremum sup X in P, we find that sup{f(x): x in X} exists and is equal to f(sup X). Such a function is also called join-preserving. Analogously, one says that f preserves finite, non-empty, directed, or arbitrary joins (or meets). The converse property is called join-reflecting.
- Prime. An ideal I in a lattice L is said to be prime, if, for all elements x and y in L, x ∧ y in I implies x in I or y in I. The dual notion is called a prime filter. Equivalently, a set is a prime filter if and only if its complement is a prime ideal.
- Principal. A filter is called principal filter if it has a least element. Dually, a principal ideal is an ideal with a greatest element. The least or greatest elements may also be called principal elements in these situations.
- Projection (operator). A self-map on a partially ordered set that is monotone and idempotent under function composition. Projections play an important role in domain theory.
- Pseudo-complement. In a Heyting algebra, the element x ⇒; 0 is called the pseudo-complement of x. It is also given by sup{y : y ∧ x = 0}, i.e. as the least upper bound of all elements y with y ∧ x = 0.

== Q ==
- Quasiorder. See preorder.
- Quasitransitive. A relation is quasitransitive if the relation on distinct elements is transitive. Transitive implies quasitransitive and quasitransitive implies acyclic.

== R ==
- Reflecting. A function f between posets P and Q is said to reflect suprema (joins), if, for all subsets X of P for which the supremum sup{f(x): x in X} exists and is of the form f(s) for some s in P, then we find that sup X exists and that sup X = s . Analogously, one says that f reflects finite, non-empty, directed, or arbitrary joins (or meets). The converse property is called join-preserving.
- Reflexive. A binary relation R on a set X is reflexive, if x R x holds for every element x in X.
- Residual. A dual map attached to a residuated mapping.
- Residuated mapping. A monotone map for which the preimage of a principal down-set is again principal. Equivalently, one component of a Galois connection.

== S ==
- Saturated chain. A chain in a poset such that no element can be added between two of its elements without losing the property of being totally ordered. If the chain is finite, this means that in every pair of successive elements the larger one covers the smaller one. See also maximal chain.
- Scattered. A total order is scattered if it has no densely ordered subset.
- Scott-continuous. A monotone function f : P → Q between posets P and Q is Scott-continuous if, for every directed set D that has a supremum sup D in P, the set {fx | x in D} has the supremum f(sup D) in Q. Stated differently, a Scott-continuous function is one that preserves all directed suprema. This is in fact equivalent to being continuous with respect to the Scott topology on the respective posets.
- Scott domain. A Scott domain is a partially ordered set which is a bounded complete algebraic cpo.
- Scott open. See Scott topology.
- Scott topology. For a poset P, a subset O is Scott-open if it is an upper set and all directed sets D that have a supremum in O have non-empty intersection with O. The set of all Scott-open sets forms a topology, the Scott topology.
- Semilattice. A semilattice is a poset in which either all finite non-empty joins (suprema) or all finite non-empty meets (infima) exist. Accordingly, one speaks of a join-semilattice or meet-semilattice.
- Smallest element. See least element.
- Sperner property of a partially ordered set
- Sperner poset
- Strictly Sperner poset
- Strongly Sperner poset
- Strict order. See strict partial order.
- Strict partial order. A strict partial order is a homogeneous binary relation that is transitive, irreflexive, and antisymmetric.
- Strict preorder. See strict partial order.
- Supremum. For a poset P and a subset X of P, the least element in the set of upper bounds of X (if it exists, which it may not) is called the supremum, join, or least upper bound of X. It is denoted by sup X or $\bigvee$X. The supremum of two elements may be written as sup{x,y} or x ∨ y. If the set X is finite, one speaks of a finite supremum. The dual notion is called infimum.
- Suzumura consistency. A binary relation R is Suzumura consistent if x R^{∗} y implies that x R y or not y R x.
- Symmetric relation. A homogeneous relation R on a set X is symmetric, if x R y implies y R x, for all elements x, y in X.

== T ==
- Top. See unit.
- Total order. A total order T is a partial order in which, for each x and y in T, we have x ≤ y or y ≤ x. Total orders are also called linear orders or chains.
- Total relation. Synonym for Connected relation.
- Transitive relation. A relation R on a set X is transitive, if x R y and y R z imply x R z, for all elements x, y, z in X.
- Transitive closure. The transitive closure R^{∗} of a relation R consists of all pairs x,y for which there exists a finite chain x R a, a R b, ..., z R y.

== U ==
- Unit. The greatest element of a poset P can be called unit or just 1 (if it exists). Another common term for this element is top. It is the infimum of the empty set and the supremum of P. The dual notion is called zero.
- Up-set. See upper set.
- Upper bound. An upper bound of a subset X of a poset P is an element b of P, such that x ≤ b, for all x in X. The dual notion is called lower bound.
- Upper set. A subset X of a poset P is called an upper set if, for all elements x in X and p in P, x ≤ p implies that p is contained in X. The dual notion is called lower set.

== V ==
- Valuation. Given a lattice $X$, a valuation $\nu : X \to [0,1]$ is strict (that is, $\nu(\varnothing) = 0$), monotone, modular (that is, $\nu(U) + \nu(V) = \nu(U \cup V) + \nu(U \cap V)$) and positive. Continuous valuations are a generalization of measures.

== W ==
- Way-below relation. In a poset P, some element x is way below y, written x<<y, if for all directed subsets D of P which have a supremum, y ≤ sup D implies x ≤ d for some d in D. One also says that x approximates y. See also domain theory.
- Weak order. A partial order ≤ on a set X is a weak order provided that the poset (X, ≤) is isomorphic to a countable collection of sets ordered by comparison of cardinality.

== Z ==
- Zero. The least element of a poset P can be called zero or just 0 (if it exists). Another common term for this element is bottom. Zero is the supremum of the empty set and the infimum of P. The dual notion is called unit.
