= Hermite's identity =

Gives the value of a summation involving the floor function

In mathematics, Hermite's identity gives the value of a summation involving the floor function. It states that for every real number x and for every positive integer n the following identity holds:

$$\sum_{k=0}^{n-1}\left\lfloor x+\frac{k}{n}\right\rfloor=\lfloor nx\rfloor .$$

It is named after the French mathematician Charles Hermite.

== Proofs ==
=== Proof by algebraic manipulation ===
Split $x$ into its integer part and fractional part, $x=\lfloor x\rfloor+\{x\}$. There is exactly one $k'\in\{1,\ldots,n\}$ with

$$\lfloor x\rfloor=\left\lfloor x+\frac{k'-1}{n}\right\rfloor\le x<\left\lfloor x+\frac{k'}{n}\right\rfloor=\lfloor x\rfloor+1.$$

By subtracting the same integer $\lfloor x\rfloor$ from inside the floor operations on the left and right sides of this inequality, it may be rewritten as

$$0=\left\lfloor \{x\}+\frac{k'-1}{n}\right\rfloor\le \{x\}<\left\lfloor \{x\}+\frac{k'}{n}\right\rfloor=1.$$

Therefore,

$$1-\frac{k'}{n}\le \{x\}<1-\frac{k'-1}{n} ,$$

and multiplying both sides by $n$ gives

$$n-k'\le n\, \{x\}<n-k'+1.$$

Now if the summation from Hermite's identity is split into two parts at index $k'$, it becomes

$$\begin{align}
\sum_{k=0}^{n-1}\left\lfloor x+\frac{k}{n}\right\rfloor
& =\sum_{k=0}^{k'-1} \lfloor x\rfloor+\sum_{k=k'}^{n-1} (\lfloor x\rfloor+1)=n\, \lfloor x\rfloor+n-k' \\[8pt]
& =n\, \lfloor x\rfloor+\lfloor n\,\{x\}\rfloor=\left\lfloor n\, \lfloor x\rfloor+n\, \{x\} \right\rfloor=\lfloor nx\rfloor.
\end{align}$$

=== Proof using functions ===
Consider the function

$$f(x) = \lfloor x \rfloor + \left\lfloor x + \frac{1}{n} \right\rfloor + \ldots + \left\lfloor x + \frac{n - 1}{n} \right\rfloor - \lfloor nx \rfloor$$

Then the identity is clearly equivalent to the statement $f(x) = 0$ for all real $x$. But then we find,

$$f\left(x + \frac{1}{n} \right) = \left\lfloor x + \frac{1}{n} \right\rfloor + \left\lfloor x + \frac{2}{n} \right\rfloor + \ldots + \left\lfloor x + 1 \right\rfloor - \lfloor nx + 1 \rfloor = f(x)$$

Where in the last equality we use the fact that $\lfloor x + p \rfloor = \lfloor x \rfloor + p$ for all integers $p$. But then $f$ has period $1/n$. It then suffices to prove that $f(x) = 0$ for all $x \in [0, 1/n)$. But in this case, the integral part of each summand in $f$ is equal to 0. We deduce that the function is indeed 0 for all real inputs $x$.
