= Quasitransitive relation =

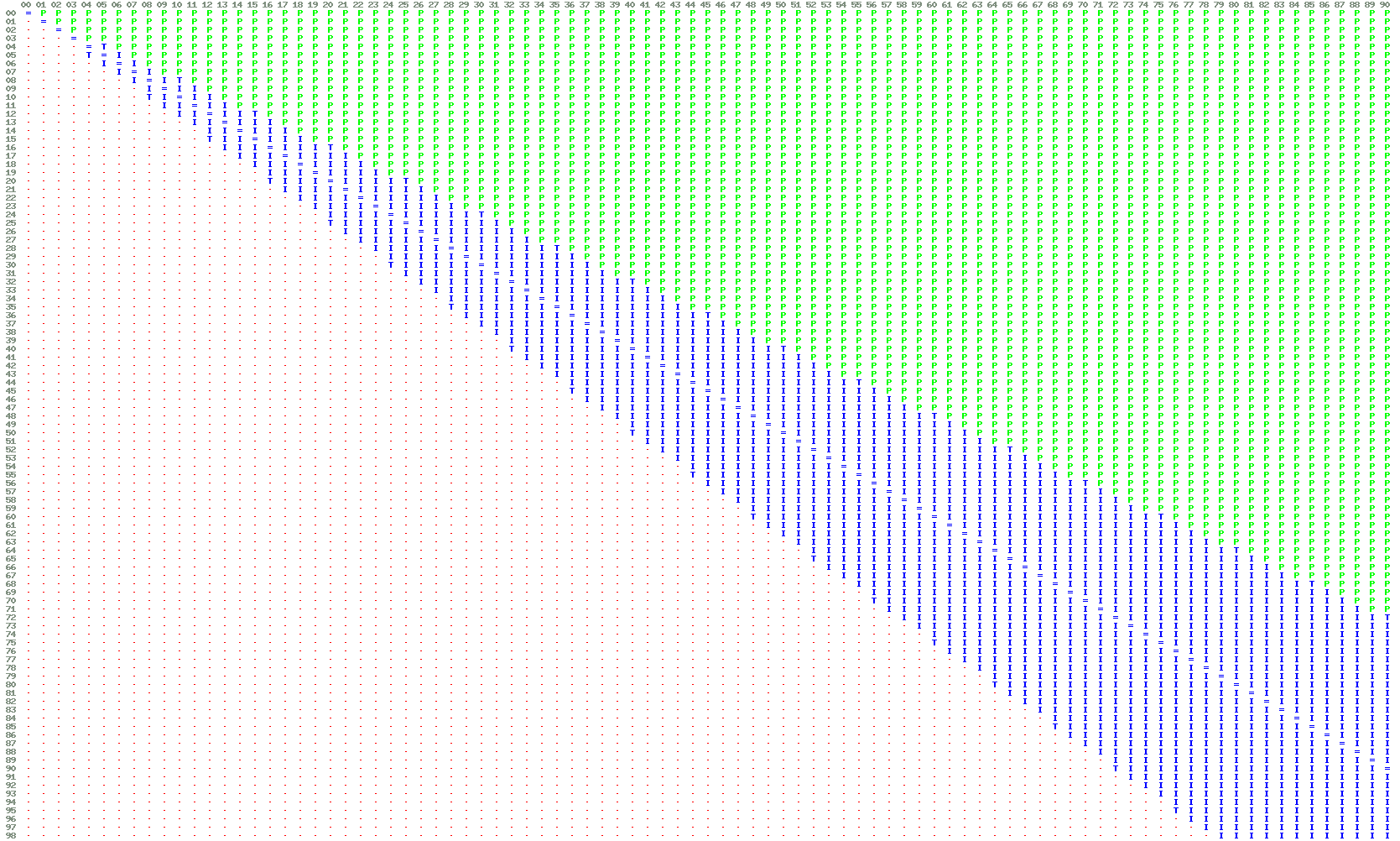
The quasitransitive relation x≤5/4y. Its symmetric and transitive part is shown in blue and green, respectively.

The mathematical notion of quasitransitivity is a weakened version of transitivity that is used in social choice theory and microeconomics. Informally, a relation is quasitransitive if it is symmetric for some values and transitive elsewhere. The concept was introduced by Sen (1969) to study the consequences of Arrow's theorem.

== Formal definition ==
A binary relation T over a set X is quasitransitive if for all a, b, and c in X the following holds:

$$(a\operatorname{T}b) \wedge \neg(b\operatorname{T}a) \wedge (b\operatorname{T}c) \wedge \neg(c\operatorname{T}b) \Rightarrow (a\operatorname{T}c) \wedge \neg(c\operatorname{T}a).$$

If the relation is also antisymmetric, T is transitive.

Alternately, for a relation T, define the asymmetric or "strict" part P:

$$(a\operatorname{P}b) \Leftrightarrow (a\operatorname{T}b) \wedge \neg(b\operatorname{T}a).$$

Then T is quasitransitive if and only if P is transitive.

== Examples ==
Preferences are assumed to be quasitransitive (rather than transitive) in some economic contexts. The classic example is a person indifferent between 7 and 8 grams of sugar and indifferent between 8 and 9 grams of sugar, but who prefers 9 grams of sugar to 7. Similarly, the Sorites paradox can be resolved by weakening assumed transitivity of certain relations to quasitransitivity.

== Properties ==
- A relation R is quasitransitive if, and only if, it is the disjoint union of a symmetric relation J and a transitive relation P. J and P are not uniquely determined by a given R; however, the P from the only-if part is minimal.
- As a consequence, each symmetric relation is quasitransitive, and so is each transitive relation. Moreover, an antisymmetric and quasitransitive relation is always transitive.
- The relation from the above sugar example, {(7,7), (7,8), (7,9), (8,7), (8,8), (8,9), (9,8), (9,9)}, is quasitransitive, but not transitive.
- A quasitransitive relation needn't be acyclic: for every non-empty set A, the universal relation A×A is both cyclic and quasitransitive.
- A relation is quasitransitive if, and only if, its complement is.
- Similarly, a relation is quasitransitive if, and only if, its converse is.

== See also ==
- Intransitivity
- Reflexive relation
