= Integer-valued function =

The floor function on real numbers. Its discontinuities are pictured with white discs outlines with blue circles.

In mathematics, an integer-valued function is a function whose values are integers. In other words, it is a function that assigns an integer to each member of its domain.

The floor and ceiling functions are examples of integer-valued functions of a real variable, but on real numbers and, generally, on (non-disconnected) topological spaces integer-valued functions are not especially useful. Any such function on a connected space either has discontinuities or is constant. On the other hand, on discrete and other totally disconnected spaces integer-valued functions have roughly the same importance as real-valued functions have on non-discrete spaces.

Any function with natural, or non-negative integer values is a partial case of an integer-valued function.

== Examples ==
Integer-valued functions defined on the domain of all real numbers include the floor and ceiling functions, the Dirichlet function, the sign function and the Heaviside step function (except possibly at 0).

Integer-valued functions defined on the domain of non-negative real numbers include the integer square root function and the prime-counting function.

== Algebraic properties ==
On an arbitrary set X, integer-valued functions form a ring with pointwise operations of addition and multiplication, and also an algebra over the ring Z of integers. Since the latter is an ordered ring, the functions form a partially ordered ring:

$$f \le g \quad\iff\quad \forall x: f(x) \le g(x).$$

== Uses ==
=== Graph theory and algebra ===
Integer-valued functions are ubiquitous in graph theory. They also have similar uses in geometric group theory, where length function represents the concept of norm, and word metric represents the concept of metric.

Integer-valued polynomials are important in ring theory.

=== Mathematical logic and computability theory ===
In mathematical logic, such concepts as primitive recursive functions and μ-recursive functions represent integer-valued functions of several natural variables or, in other words, functions on N^{n}. Gödel numbering, defined on well-formed formulae of some formal language, is a natural-valued function.

Computability theory is essentially based on natural numbers and natural (or integer) functions on them.

=== Number theory ===
In number theory, many arithmetic functions are integer-valued.

=== Computer science ===
In computer programming, many functions return values of integer type due to simplicity of implementation.

== See also ==
- Integer-valued polynomial
- Semi-continuity
- Rank (disambiguation)#Mathematics
- Grade (disambiguation)#In mathematics
