= Prusinowice, Opole Voivodeship =

Prusinowice
- Village
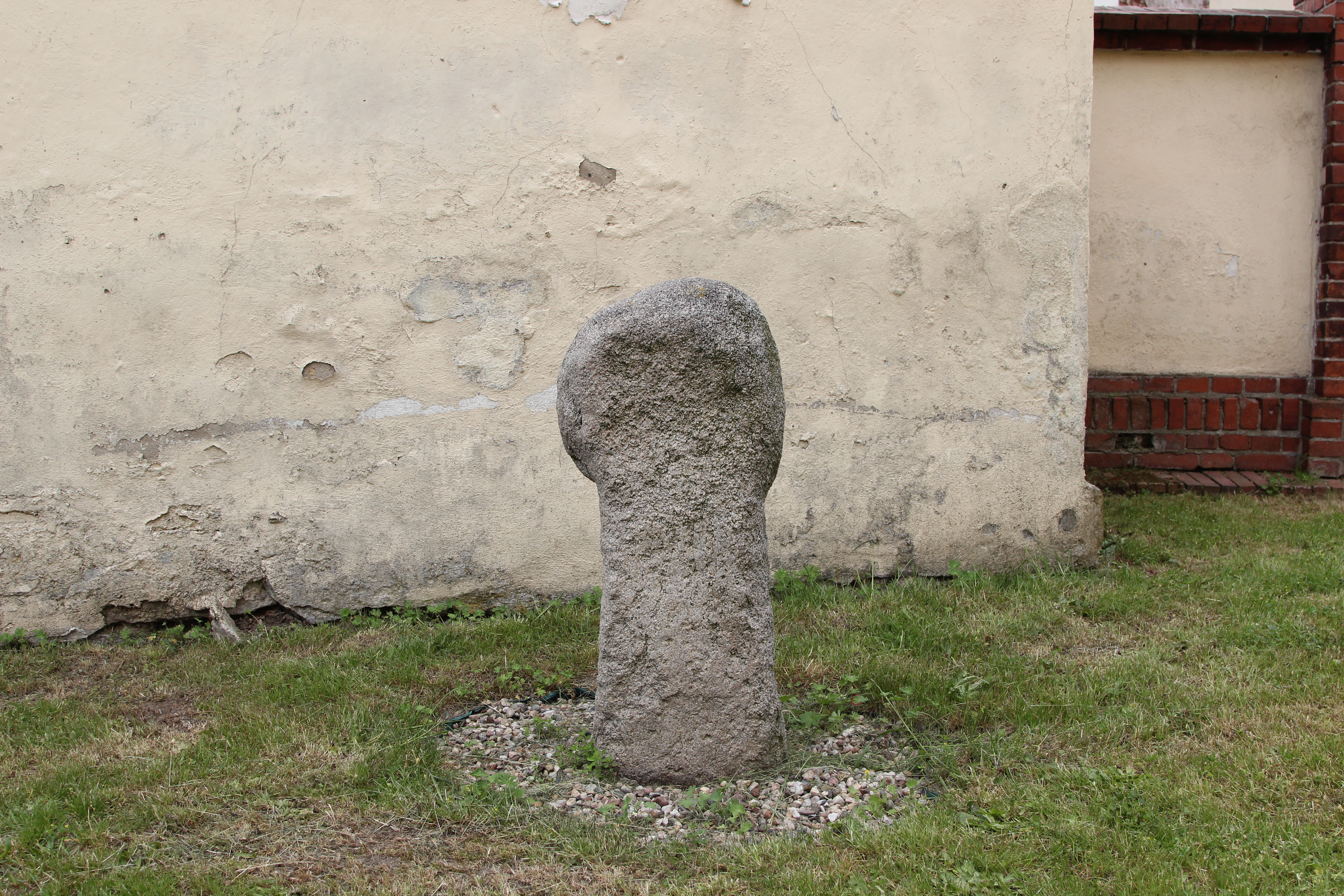
- Stone cross

- Location within Poland
- Coordinates: 50°32′N 17°25′E
- Country: Poland
- Voivodeship: Opole
- County: Nysa
- Gmina: Pakosławice

Prusinowice [pruɕinɔˈvit͡sɛ] (German: Waltdorf) is a village in the administrative district of Gmina Pakosławice, within Nysa County, Opole Voivodeship, in south-western Poland.

== Notable residents ==
- Emanuel Sperner (1905–1980), German mathematician
