= Kenneth P. Bogart =

American mathematician

- Born: August 6, 1943; Cincinnati, Ohio
- Died: March 30, 2005 (aged 61); Santa Rosa, California
- Education: California Institute of Technology
- Scientific career
- Fields: combinatorics, preference structures
- Workplaces: Dartmouth College

Kenneth Paul Bogart (August 6, 1943 – March 30, 2005) was an American mathematician known for his work on preference structures and for his textbook on combinatorics. He was a professor at Dartmouth College.

== Education and career ==
Bogart was originally from Cincinnati, and was a 1965 graduate of Marietta College. He earned his Ph.D. in 1968 at the California Institute of Technology. His dissertation, Structure Theorems for Local Noether Lattices, was supervised by Robert P. Dilworth.

He joined the faculty of the Dartmouth College mathematics department in 1968, was promoted to full professor in 1980, and was chair of the department from 1989 to 1995. While at Dartmouth, he supervised 17 doctoral students, and was also active in the mentorship of freshman women in research projects in mathematics, including Tara S. Holm, later to become a professional mathematician.

== Textbook ==
Bogart was the author of the textbook Introductory Combinatorics (Pitman, 1983; 3rd ed., Academic Press, 2000).
