= Robert P. Dilworth =

American mathematician

Robert Palmer Dilworth (December 2, 1914 – October 29, 1993) was an American mathematician. His primary research area was lattice theory; his biography at the MacTutor History of Mathematics archive states "it would not be an exaggeration to say that he was one of the main factors in the subject moving from being merely a tool of other disciplines to an important subject in its own right". He is best known for Dilworth's theorem (Dilworth 1950) relating chains and antichains in partial orders; he was also the first to study antimatroids (Dilworth 1940).

Dilworth was born in 1914 in Hemet, California, at that time a remote desert ranching town. He went to college at the California Institute of Technology, receiving his baccalaureate in 1936 and continuing there for his graduate studies. Dilworth's graduate advisor was Morgan Ward, a student of Eric Temple Bell, who was also on the Caltech faculty at the time. On receiving his Ph.D. in 1939, Dilworth took an instructorship at Yale University. While at Yale, he met and married his wife, Miriam White, with whom he eventually had two sons. He returned to Caltech as a faculty member in 1943, and spent the remainder of his academic career there. Dilworth advised 17 Ph.D. students and as of 2020 has 635 academic descendants listed at the Mathematics Genealogy Project, many through his student Juris Hartmanis, a noted complexity theorist. Other notable mathematicians advised by Dilworth include Curtis Greene and Alfred W. Hales.

== Selected bibliography ==
- Bogart, Kenneth P.; Freese, Ralph; Kung, Joseph P. S., eds. (1990), Dilworth Theorems: Selected Papers of Robert P. Dilworth, Contemporary Mathematicians, Birkhauser, ISBN 978-0-8176-3434-6.
- Crawley, Peter; Dilworth, Robert P. (1973), Algebraic Theory of Lattices, Englewood Cliffs, N.J.: Prentice-Hall, ISBN 978-0-13-022269-5.
- Dilworth, Robert P. (1940), "Lattices with unique irreducible decompositions", Annals of Mathematics, 41 (4): 771–777, doi:10.2307/1968857, JSTOR 1968857.
- Dilworth, Robert P. (1950), "A decomposition theorem for partially ordered sets", Annals of Mathematics, 51 (1): 161–166, doi:10.2307/1969503, JSTOR 1969503.
- Dilworth, Robert P.; Greene, Curtis (1971), "A counterexample to the generalization of Sperner's theorem", Journal of Combinatorial Theory, Series A, 10: 18–21, doi:10.1016/0097-3165(71)90063-X, MR 0276145.

== References and external links ==
- Bogart, Kenneth P. (1995), "R. P. Dilworth", Order, 12 (1): 1–4, doi:10.1007/BF01108587, S2CID 123296653.
- O'Connor, John J.; Robertson, Edmund F., "Robert Palmer Dilworth", MacTutor History of Mathematics Archive, University of St Andrews
- Robert Palmer Dilworth at the Mathematics Genealogy Project.
