= Kurt Leichtweiss =

German mathematician

Kurt Leichtweiß
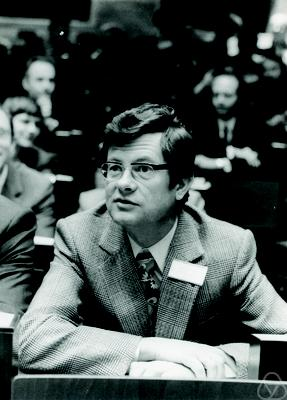
- 1974 in Hanover
- Born: March 2, 1927; Villingen-Schwenningen
- Died: June 23, 2013 (aged 86)
- Education: University of Freiburg, ETH Zurich
- Alma mater: University of Freiburg
- Scientific career
- Institutions: TU Berlin, University of Stuttgart
- Thesis: Zur Axiomatik einer topologischen Begründung der Geometrie der Ebene und des Raums (1951)
- Doctoral advisor: Emanuel Sperner
- Doctoral students: Roswitha Blind; Hartmut Ehrig; Hermann Karcher

Kurt Leichtweiß (March 2, 1927 in Villingen-Schwenningen – June 23, 2013) was a mathematician specializing in convex and differential geometry.

In 1944, while still in high school Leichtweiß traveled to the Oberwolfach Research Institute for Mathematics where his mathematical interests were encouraged. He studied at the University of Freiburg and the ETH Zurich. He was a student of Emanuel Sperner and Wilhelm Süss. He was then a lecturer in Freiburg and in 1963 became a professor at TU Berlin. From 1970 until his retirement in 1995, he was a professor at the University of Stuttgart. In 1995, he received the Wilhelm Blaschke Medal.

== Books ==
- (with Wilhelm Blaschke), Elementary Differential Geometry, Springer, 1973.
- Affine geometry of convex bodies, Wiley, 1998.
- Convex Geometry, Springer, 1980.
- Analytic Geometry, First Course, Teubner, 1972.
