= Mirskis =

Mirskis is a Latvian surname of Polish origin (Polish: Mirsky). Notable people with the surname include:

- Aleksandrs Mirskis (born 1964), Latvian politician
- Sergejs Mirskis (born 1952), Latvian politician

== See also ==
- Mirsky (disambiguation)
