= Strong antichain =

Concept in the mathematics of partial orders

In order theory, a subset A of a partially ordered set P is a strong downwards antichain if it is an antichain in which no two distinct elements have a common lower bound in P, that is,

$$\forall x, y \in A \; [x \neq y \rightarrow \neg\exists z \in P \; [ z \leq x \land z \leq y]].$$

In the case where P is ordered by inclusion, and closed under subsets, but does not contain the empty set, this is simply a family of pairwise disjoint sets.

A strong upwards antichain B is a subset of P in which no two distinct elements have a common upper bound in P. Authors will often omit the "upwards" and "downwards" term and merely refer to strong antichains. Unfortunately, there is no common convention as to which version is called a strong antichain. In the context of forcing, authors will sometimes also omit the "strong" term and merely refer to antichains. To resolve ambiguities in this case, the weaker type of antichain is called a weak antichain.

If (P, ≤) is a partial order and there exist distinct x, y ∈ P such that {x, y} is a strong antichain, then (P, ≤) cannot be a lattice (or even a meet semilattice), since by definition, every two elements in a lattice (or meet semilattice) must have a common lower bound. Thus lattices have only trivial strong antichains (i.e., strong antichains of cardinality at most 1).
