= Sperner property of a partially ordered set =

In order-theoretic mathematics, a graded partially ordered set is said to have the Sperner property (and hence is called a Sperner poset), if no antichain within it is larger than the largest rank level (one of the sets of elements of the same rank) in the poset. Since every rank level is itself an antichain, the Sperner property is equivalently the property that some rank level is a maximum antichain. The Sperner property and Sperner posets are named after Emanuel Sperner, who proved Sperner's theorem stating that the family of all subsets of a finite set (partially ordered by set inclusion) has this property. The lattice of partitions of a finite set typically lacks the Sperner property.

== Examples ==
The Boolean lattice formed by all subsets of an n-element set, ordered by inclusion, satisfies the Sperner property, as shown by Sperner's theorem.

== Variations ==
A k-Sperner poset is a graded poset in which no union of k antichains is larger than the union of the k largest rank levels, or, equivalently, the poset has a maximum k-family consisting of k rank levels.

A strict Sperner poset is a graded poset in which all maximum antichains are rank levels.

A strongly Sperner poset is a graded poset which is k-Sperner for all values of k up to the largest rank value.
