= Donald J. Newman =

American mathematician (1930–2007)

- Born: July 27, 1930; Brooklyn, New York
- Died: March 28, 2007 (aged 76); Philadelphia, Pennsylvania
- Education: Harvard University
- Spouse: Herta Newman
- Children: David Newman and Danny Newman
- Awards: Individual Putnam fellow - 1948
- Scientific career
- Fields: Mathematics
- Workplaces: Yeshiva University; Temple University; New York University
- Doctoral advisor: David Widder; Joseph Leonard Walsh

Donald Joseph (D. J.) Newman (July 27, 1930 – March 28, 2007) was an American mathematician. He gave simple proofs of the prime number theorem and the Hardy–Ramanujan partition formula. He excelled on multiple occasions at the annual Putnam competition while studying at City College of New York and New York University, and later received his PhD from Harvard University in 1953.

== Life and works ==
Newman was born in Brooklyn, New York, in 1930, and studied at New York's Stuyvesant High School. When he was 14 he worked with Dubble Bubble Gum to help solve the statistical question of how often a gum purchaser would receive the same joke for their gum wrapper. He was an avid problem-solver, and as an undergraduate was a Putnam Fellow all three years he took part in the Putnam math competition; only the third person to attain that feat. His mathematical specialties included complex analysis, approximation theory and number theory. In 1980 he found a short proof of the prime number theorem, which can now be found in his textbook on Complex analysis. He also gave a simplified proof of the Hardy-Ramanujans partition formula.

Newman was a friend and associate of John Nash. His career included posts as a professor of mathematics at MIT, Brown University, Yeshiva University, Temple University and a distinguished chair at Bar Ilan University in Israel.

Newman's love of problem solving comes through in his writing; his published output as a mathematician includes 150 papers and five books. He taught numerous students over the years, including Robert Feinerman, Jonah Mann, Eli Passow, Louis Raymon, Joseph Bak, Shmuel Weinberger, and Gerald Weinstein at Yeshiva University, and Bo Gao, Don Kellman, Jonathan Knappenberger, and Yuan Xu at Temple University.

== See also ==
- A Beautiful Mind (1998) by Sylvia Nasar

== Selected publications ==
- Newman, Donald J. (1960). "A simplified proof of Waring's conjecture". Michigan Mathematical Journal. 7 (3): 291–295. doi:10.1307/mmj/1028998439.
- Newman, Donald J. (1975). "A simple proof of Wiener's $1/f$ theorem". Proceedings of the American Mathematical Society. 48 (1): 264–265. doi:10.2307/2040730. JSTOR 2040730. MR 0365002.
- --. (1979) Approximation with rational functions. Providence, RI: Conference Board of the Mathematical Sciences by the American Mathematical Society. ISBN 0-8218-1691-8.
- Newman, Donald J. (1980). "Simple analytic proof of the prime number theorem" (PDF). American Mathematical Monthly. 87 (9): 693–696. doi:10.2307/2321853. JSTOR 2321853. MR 0602825.
- --. (1982) A problem seminar. New York: Springer. ISBN 0-387-90765-3.
- --. (1998) Analytic number theory. New York: Springer. ISBN 0-387-98308-2 (#177 in the Graduate Texts in Mathematics series).
- (1996) Complex Analysis. (2004 update w/ Joseph Bak)
- with Robert P. Feinerman: (1974) Polynomial approximation. Baltimore: Williams & Wilkins. ISBN 0-6830-3077-9.

=== Papers and monographs ===
- The Hexagon Theorem (1982 )
- Finite type functions as limits of exponential sums (1974, MRC technical summary report)
- Splines and the logarithmic function (1974, MRC)
- Thought Less Mathematics, an essay on why branching thinking and similar solutions aren't central to mathematics and may even obscure deeper ideas
