= Antichain =

Subset of incomparable elements

In mathematics, in the area of order theory, an antichain is a subset of a partially ordered set such that any two distinct elements in the subset are incomparable.

The size of the largest antichain in a finite partially ordered set is known as its width. By Dilworth's theorem, this also equals the minimum number of chains (totally ordered subsets) into which the set can be partitioned. Dually, the height of the finite partially ordered set (the length of its longest chain) equals by Mirsky's theorem the minimum number of antichains into which the set can be partitioned.

The family of all antichains in a finite partially ordered set can be given join and meet operations, making them into a distributive lattice. For the partially ordered system of all subsets of a finite set, ordered by set inclusion, the antichains are called Sperner families and their lattice is a free distributive lattice, with a Dedekind number of elements. More generally, counting the number of antichains of a finite partially ordered set is #P-complete.

== Definitions ==
Let $S$ be a partially ordered set. Two elements $a$ and $b$ of a partially ordered set are called comparable if $a \leq b$ or $b \leq a.$ If two elements are not comparable, they are called incomparable; that is, $x$ and $y$ are incomparable if neither $x \leq y$ nor $y \leq x.$

A chain in $S$ is a subset $C \subseteq S$ in which each pair of elements is comparable; that is, $C$ is totally ordered. An antichain in $S$ is a subset $A \subseteq S$ in which each pair of different elements is incomparable; that is, there is no order relation between any two different elements in $A.$ (However, some authors use the term "antichain" to mean strong antichain, a subset such that there is no element of the poset smaller than two distinct elements of the antichain.)

== Height and width ==
A maximal antichain is an antichain that is not a proper subset of any other antichain. A maximum antichain is an antichain that has cardinality at least as large as every other antichain. The width of a partially ordered set is the cardinality of a maximum antichain. Any antichain can intersect any chain in at most one element, so, if we can partition the elements of an order into $k$ chains then the width of the order must be at most $k$ (if the antichain has more than $k$ elements, by the pigeonhole principle, there would be 2 of its elements belonging to the same chain, a contradiction). Dilworth's theorem states that this bound can always be reached: there always exists an antichain, and a partition of the elements into chains, such that the number of chains equals the number of elements in the antichain, which must therefore also equal the width. Similarly, one can define the height of a partial order to be the maximum cardinality of a chain. Mirsky's theorem states that in any partial order of finite height, the height equals the smallest number of antichains into which the order may be partitioned.

== Sperner families ==
An antichain in the inclusion ordering of subsets of an $n$-element set is known as a Sperner family. The number of different Sperner families is counted by the Dedekind numbers, the first few of which numbers are

2, 3, 6, 20, 168, 7581, 7828354, 2414682040998, 56130437228687557907788 (sequence A000372 in the OEIS).

Even the empty set has two antichains in its power set: one containing a single set (the empty set itself) and one containing no sets.

== Join and meet operations ==
Any antichain $A$ corresponds to a lower set
$$L_A = \{x : \exists y \in A \mbox{ such that } x \leq y\}.$$
In a finite partial order (or more generally a partial order satisfying the ascending chain condition) all lower sets have this form. The union of any two lower sets is another lower set, and the union operation corresponds in this way to a join operation on antichains:
$$A \vee B = \{ x \in A \cup B : \nexists y \in A \cup B \mbox{ such that } x < y\}.$$
Similarly, we can define a meet operation on antichains, corresponding to the intersection of lower sets:
$$A \wedge B = \{ x \in L_A \cap L_B : \nexists y \in L_A \cap L_B \mbox{ such that } x < y\}.$$
The join and meet operations on all finite antichains of finite subsets of a set $X$ define a distributive lattice, the free distributive lattice generated by $X.$ Birkhoff's representation theorem for distributive lattices states that every finite distributive lattice can be represented via join and meet operations on antichains of a finite partial order, or equivalently as union and intersection operations on the lower sets of the partial order.

== Computational complexity ==
In a finite partially ordered set, the maximum antichain (and its size, the width of a given partially ordered set) can be found in polynomial time. Counting the number of antichains in a given partially ordered set is #P-complete.
