= Supersolvable lattice =

Graded lattice with modular maximal chain

In mathematics, a supersolvable lattice is a graded lattice that has a maximal chain of elements, each of which obeys a certain modularity relationship. The definition encapsulates many of the nice properties of lattices of subgroups of supersolvable groups.

== Motivation ==
A finite group $G$ is said to be supersolvable if it admits a maximal chain (or series) of subgroups so that each subgroup in the chain is normal in $G$. A normal subgroup has been known since the 1940s to be left and (dual) right modular as an element of the lattice of subgroups. Richard Stanley noticed in the 1970s that certain geometric lattices, such as the partition lattice, obeyed similar properties, and gave a lattice-theoretic abstraction.

== Definition ==
A finite graded lattice $L$ is supersolvable if it admits a maximal chain $\mathbf{m}$ of elements (called an M-chain or chief chain) obeying any of the following equivalent properties.

1. For any chain $\mathbf{c}$ of elements, the smallest sublattice of $L$ containing all the elements of $\mathbf{m}$ and $\mathbf{c}$ is distributive. This is the original condition of Stanley.
2. Every element of $\mathbf{m}$ is left modular. That is, for each $m$ in $\mathbf{m}$ and each $x \leq y$ in $L$, we have $(x\vee m)\wedge y=x\vee(m\wedge y).$
3. Every element of $\mathbf{m}$ is rank modular, in the following sense: if $\rho$ is the rank function of $L$, then for each $m$ in $\mathbf{m}$ and each $x$ in $L$, we have $\rho(m\wedge x)+\rho(m\vee x)=\rho(m)+\rho(x).$

For comparison, a finite lattice is geometric if and only if it is atomistic and the elements of the antichain of atoms are all left modular.

An extension of the definition is that of a left modular lattice: a not-necessarily graded lattice with a maximal chain consisting of left modular elements. Thus, a left modular lattice requires the condition of (2), but relaxes the requirement of gradedness.

== Examples ==
Hasse diagram of the noncrossing partition lattice on a 4 element set. The leftmost maximal chain is a chief chain.

A group is supersolvable if and only if its lattice of subgroups is supersolvable. A chief series of subgroups forms a chief chain in the lattice of subgroups.

The partition lattice of a finite set is supersolvable. A partition is left modular in this lattice if and only if it has at most one non-singleton part; thus, the partition lattice is also geometric. The noncrossing partition lattice is similarly supersolvable, although it is not geometric.

The lattice of flats of the graphic matroid for a graph is supersolvable if and only if the graph is chordal. Working from the top, the chief chain is obtained by removing vertices in a perfect elimination ordering one by one.

Every modular lattice is supersolvable, as every element in such a lattice is left modular and rank modular.

== Properties ==
A finite matroid with a supersolvable lattice of flats (equivalently, a lattice that is both geometric and supersolvable) has a real-rooted characteristic polynomial. This is a consequence of a more general factorization theorem for characteristic polynomials over modular elements.

The Orlik-Solomon algebra of an arrangement of hyperplanes with a supersolvable intersection lattice is a Koszul algebra. For more information, see Supersolvable arrangement.

Any finite supersolvable lattice has an edge lexicographic labeling (or EL-labeling), hence its order complex is shellable and Cohen-Macaulay. Indeed, supersolvable lattices can be characterized in terms of edge lexicographic labelings: a finite lattice of height $n$ is supersolvable if and only if it has an edge lexicographic labeling that assigns to each maximal chain a permutation of $\{ 1, \dots, n\}.$
