= 0,1-simple lattice =

In lattice theory, a bounded lattice L is called a 0,1-simple lattice if nonconstant lattice homomorphisms of L preserve the identity of its top and bottom elements. That is, if L is 0,1-simple and ƒ is a function from L to some other lattice that preserves joins and meets and does not map every element of L to a single element of the image, then it must be the case that ƒ^{−1}(ƒ(0)) = {0} and ƒ^{−1}(ƒ(1)) = {1}.

For instance, let L_{n} be a (flat) lattice with n atoms a_{1}, a_{2}, ..., a_{n}, top and bottom elements 1 and 0, and no other elements. Then for n ≥ 3, L_{n} is 0,1-simple. However, for n = 2, the function ƒ that maps 0 and a_{1} to 0 and that maps a_{2} and 1 to 1 is a homomorphism, showing that L_{2} is not 0,1-simple.
