= Map of lattices =

Concept in mathematics

The concept of a lattice arises in order theory, a branch of mathematics. The Hasse diagram below depicts the inclusion relationships among some important subclasses of lattices.

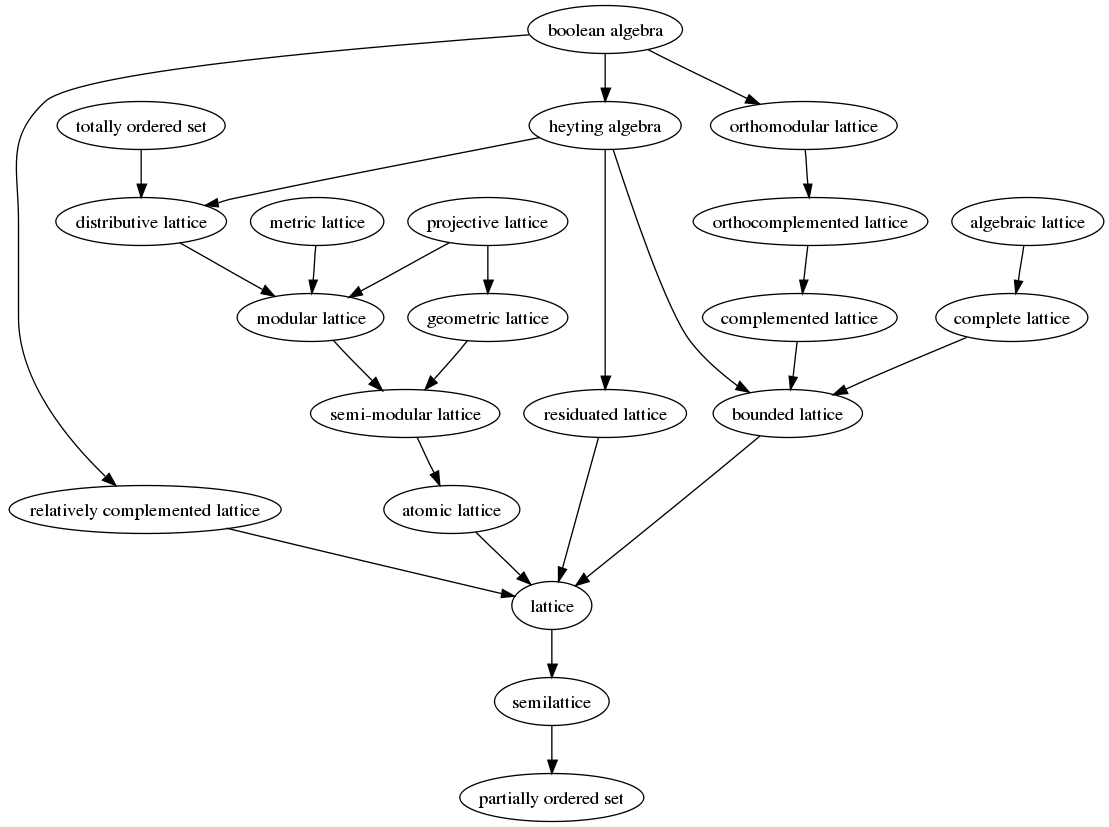
Diagram showing implications of common lattice properties

== Proofs of the relationships in the map ==
1. A boolean algebra is a complemented distributive lattice. (def)

2. A boolean algebra is a heyting algebra.

3. A boolean algebra is orthocomplemented.

4. A distributive orthocomplemented lattice is orthomodular.

5. A boolean algebra is orthomodular. (1,3,4)

6. An orthomodular lattice is orthocomplemented. (def)

7. An orthocomplemented lattice is complemented. (def)

8. A complemented lattice is bounded. (def)

9. An algebraic lattice is complete. (def)

10. A complete lattice is bounded.

11. A heyting algebra is bounded. (def)

12. A bounded lattice is a lattice. (def)

13. A heyting algebra is residuated.

14. A residuated lattice is a lattice. (def)

15. A distributive lattice is modular.

16. A modular complemented lattice is relatively complemented.

17. A boolean algebra is relatively complemented. (1,15,16)

18. A relatively complemented lattice is a lattice. (def)

19. A heyting algebra is distributive.

20. A totally ordered set is a distributive lattice.

21. A metric lattice is modular.

22. A modular lattice is semi-modular.

23. A projective lattice is modular.

24. A projective lattice is geometric. (def)

25. A geometric lattice is semi-modular.

26. A semi-modular lattice is atomic.

27. An atomic lattice is a lattice. (def)

28. A lattice is a semi-lattice. (def)

29. A semi-lattice is a partially ordered set. (def)
