= Slim lattice =

In lattice theory, a mathematical discipline, a finite lattice is slim if no three join-irreducible elements form an antichain. Every slim lattice is planar. A finite planar semimodular lattice is slim if and only if it contains no cover-preserving diamond sublattice M_{3} (this is the original definition of a slim lattice due to George Grätzer and Edward Knapp).
