= Supersolvable arrangement =

Arrangement of hyperplanes

In mathematics, a supersolvable arrangement is a hyperplane arrangement that has a maximal flag consisting of modular elements. Equivalently, the intersection semilattice of the arrangement is a supersolvable lattice, in the sense of Richard P. Stanley. As shown by Hiroaki Terao, a complex hyperplane arrangement is supersolvable if and only if its complement is fiber-type.

Examples include arrangements associated with Coxeter groups of type A and B.

The Orlik–Solomon algebra of every supersolvable arrangement is a Koszul algebra; whether the converse is true is an open problem.
