= Boolean analysis =

Boolean analysis was introduced by Flament (1976). The goal of a Boolean analysis is to detect deterministic dependencies between the items of a questionnaire or similar data-structures in observed response patterns. These deterministic dependencies have the form of logical formulas connecting the items. Assume, for example, that a questionnaire contains items i, j, and k. Examples of such deterministic dependencies are then i → j, i ∧ j → k, and i ∨ j → k.

Since the basic work of Flament (1976) a number of different methods for Boolean analysis have been developed. See, for example, Buggenhaut and Degreef (1987), Duquenne (1987), item tree analysis Leeuwe (1974), Schrepp (1999), or Theuns (1998). These methods share the goal to derive deterministic dependencies between the items of a questionnaire from data, but differ in the algorithms to reach this goal.

Boolean analysis is an explorative method to detect deterministic dependencies between items. The detected dependencies must be confirmed in subsequent research. Methods of Boolean analysis do not assume that the detected dependencies describe the data completely. There may be other probabilistic dependencies as well. Thus, a Boolean analysis tries to detect interesting deterministic structures in the data, but has not the goal to uncover all structural aspects in the data set. Therefore, it makes sense to use other methods, like for example latent class analysis, together with a Boolean analysis.

== Application areas ==
The investigation of deterministic dependencies has some tradition in educational psychology. The items represent in this area usually skills or cognitive abilities of subjects. Bart and Airasian (1974) use Boolean analysis to establish logical implications on a set of Piagetian tasks. Other examples in this tradition are the learning hierarchies of Gagné (1968) or the theory of structural learning of Scandura (1971).

There are several attempts to use boolean analysis, especially item tree analysis to construct knowledge spaces from data. Examples can be found in Held and Korossy (1998), or Schrepp (2002).

Methods of Boolean analysis are used in a number of social science studies to get insight into the structure of dichotomous data. Bart and Krus (1973) use, for example, Boolean analysis to establish a hierarchical order on items that describe socially unaccepted behavior. Janssens (1999) used a method of Boolean analysis to investigate the integration process of minorities into the value system of the dominant culture. Romme (1995a) introduced Boolean comparative analysis to the management sciences, and applied it in a study of self-organizing processes in management teams (Romme 1995b).

== Relations to other areas ==
Boolean analysis has some relations to other research areas. There is a close connection between Boolean analysis and knowledge spaces. The theory of knowledge spaces provides a theoretical framework for the formal description of human knowledge. A knowledge domain is in this approach represented by a set Q of problems. The knowledge of a subject in the domain is then described by the subset of problems from Q he or she is able to solve. This set is called the knowledge state of the subject. Because of dependencies between the items (for example, if solving item j implies solving item i) not all elements of the power set of Q will, in general, be possible knowledge states. The set of all possible knowledge states is called the knowledge structure. Methods of Boolean analysis can be used to construct a knowledge structure from data (for example, Theuns, 1998 or Schrepp, 1999). The main difference between both research areas is that Boolean analysis concentrates on the extraction of structures from data while knowledge space theory focus on the structural properties of the relation between a knowledge structure and the logical formulas which describe it.

Closely related to knowledge space theory is formal concept analysis (Ganter and Wille, 1996). Similar to knowledge space theory this approach concentrates on the formal description and visualization of existing dependencies. Formal concept analysis offers very effective ways to construct such dependencies from data, with a focus on if-then expressions ("implications"). There is even a method, called attribute exploration, for extracting all implications from hard-to-access data.

Another related field is data mining. Data mining deals with the extraction of knowledge from large databases. Several data mining algorithms extract dependencies of the form j → i (called association rules) from the database.

The main difference between Boolean analysis and the extraction of association rules in data mining is the interpretation of the extracted implications. The goal of a Boolean analysis is to extract implications from the data which are (with the exception of random errors in the response behavior) true for all rows in the data set. For data mining applications it is sufficient to detect implications which fulfill a predefined level of accuracy.

It is, for example in a marketing scenario, of interest to find implications which are true for more than x% of the rows in the data set. An online bookshop may be interested, for example, to search for implications of the form If a customer orders book A he also orders book B if they are fulfilled by more than 10% of the available customer data.
