= Skew lattice =

In abstract algebra, a skew lattice is an algebraic structure that is a non-commutative generalization of a lattice. While the term skew lattice can be used to refer to any non-commutative generalization of a lattice, since 1989 it has been used primarily as follows.

== Definition ==
A skew lattice is a set S equipped with two associative, idempotent binary operations $\wedge$ and $\vee$, called meet and join, that validate the following dual pair of absorption laws

$x\wedge (x\vee y) = x = (y\vee x)\wedge x$,
$x\vee (x\wedge y) = x = (y\wedge x)\vee x$.

Given that $\vee$ and $\wedge$ are associative and idempotent, these identities are equivalent to validating the following dual pair of statements:

$x\vee y= x$ if and only if $x\wedge y=y$,
$x\wedge y=x$ if and only if $x\vee y=y$.

== Historical background ==
For over 60 years, noncommutative variations of lattices have been studied with differing motivations. For some the motivation has been an interest in the conceptual boundaries of lattice theory; for others it was a search for noncommutative forms of logic and Boolean algebra; and for others it has been the behavior of idempotents in rings. A noncommutative lattice, generally speaking, is an algebra $(S; \wedge, \vee)$ where $\wedge$ and $\vee$ are associative, idempotent binary operations connected by absorption identities guaranteeing that $\wedge$ in some way dualizes $\vee$. The precise identities chosen depends upon the underlying motivation, with differing choices producing distinct varieties of algebras.

Pascual Jordan, motivated by questions in quantum logic, initiated a study of noncommutative lattices in his 1949 paper, Über Nichtkommutative Verbände, choosing the absorption identities

$x\wedge (y\vee x) = x = (x\wedge y)\vee x.$

He referred to those algebras satisfying them as Schrägverbände. By varying or augmenting these identities, Jordan and others obtained a number of varieties of noncommutative lattices. Beginning with Jonathan Leech's 1989 paper, Skew lattices in rings, skew lattices as defined above have been the primary objects of study. This was aided by previous results about bands. This was especially the case for many of the basic properties.

== Basic properties ==
Natural partial order and natural quasiorder

In a skew lattice $S$, the natural partial order is defined by $y\leq x$ if $x \wedge y = y = y \wedge x$, or dually, $x \vee y = x = y \vee x$. The natural preorder on $S$ is given by $y \preceq x$ if $y \wedge x\wedge y = y$ or dually $x \vee y \vee x = x$. While $\leq$ and $\preceq$ agree on lattices, $\leq$ properly refines $\preceq$ in the noncommutative case. The induced natural equivalence $D$ is defined by $xDy$ if $x \preceq y \preceq x$, that is, $x \wedge y \wedge x = x$ and $y \wedge x \wedge y = y$ or dually, $x \vee y \vee x = x$ and $y \vee x \vee y = y$. The blocks of the partition $S/D$ are lattice ordered by $A > B$ if and only if $a \in A$ and $b \in B$ exist such that $a > b$. This permits us to draw Hasse diagrams of skew lattices such as the following pair:

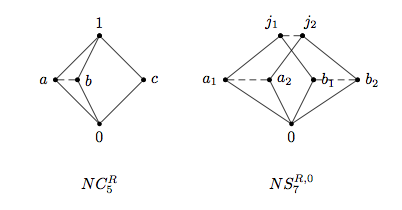

E.g., in the diagram on the left above, that $a$ and $b$ are $D$ related is expressed by the dashed segment. The slanted lines reveal the natural partial order between elements of the distinct $D$-classes. The elements $1$, $c$ and $0$ form the singleton $D$-classes.

Rectangular Skew Lattices

Skew lattices consisting of a single $D$-class are called rectangular. They are characterized by the equivalent identities: $x \wedge y \wedge x = x$, $y \vee x \vee y = y$ and $x \vee y = y \wedge x$. Rectangular skew lattices are isomorphic to skew lattices having the following construction (and conversely): given nonempty sets $L$ and $R$, on $L \times R$ define $(x, y) \vee (z , w ) = (z , y)$ and $(x, y) \wedge (z , w ) = (x, w )$. The $D$-class partition of a skew lattice $S$, as indicated in the above diagrams, is the unique partition of $S$ into its maximal rectangular subalgebras, Moreover, $D$ is a congruence with the induced quotient algebra $S/ D$ being the maximal lattice image of $S$, thus making every skew lattice $S$ a lattice of rectangular subalgebras. This is the Clifford–McLean theorem for skew lattices, first given for bands separately by Clifford and McLean. It is also known as the first decomposition theorem for skew lattices.

Right (left) handed skew lattices and the Kimura factorization

A skew lattice is right-handed if it satisfies the identity $x\wedge y \wedge x = y \wedge x$ or dually, $x \vee y \vee x = x \vee y$. These identities essentially assert that $x \wedge y = y$ and $x \vee y = x$ in each $D$-class. Every skew lattice $S$ has a unique maximal right-handed image $S/ L$ where the congruence $L$ is defined by $xLy$ if both $x \wedge y = x$ and $y \wedge x = y$ (or dually, $x \vee y = y$ and $y \vee x = x$). Likewise a skew lattice is left-handed if $x \wedge y = x$ and $x \vee y = y$ in each $D$-class. Again the maximal left-handed image of a skew lattice $S$ is the image $S/ R$ where the congruence $R$ is defined in dual fashion to $L$. Many examples of skew lattices are either right- or left-handed. In the lattice of congruences, $R \vee L = D$ and $R \cap L$ is the identity congruence $\Delta$. The induced epimorphism $S\rightarrow S/D$ factors through both induced epimorphisms $S \rightarrow S/L$ and $S \rightarrow S/R$. Setting $T = S/D$, the homomorphism $k : S \rightarrow S/L \times S/R$ defined by $k(x) = (L_x, R_x)$, induces an isomorphism $k* : S\sim S/ L \times _T S/R$. This is the Kimura factorization of $S$ into a fibred product of its maximal right- and left-handed images.

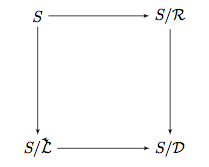

Like the Clifford–McLean theorem, Kimura factorization (or the second decomposition theorem for skew lattices) was first given for regular bands (bands that satisfy the middle absorption identity, $xyxzx = xyzx$). Indeed, both $\wedge$ and $\vee$ are regular band operations. The above symbols $D$, $R$ and $L$ come, of course, from basic semigroup theory.

== Subvarieties of skew lattices ==
Skew lattices form a variety. Rectangular skew lattices, left-handed and right-handed skew lattices all form subvarieties that are central to the basic structure theory of skew lattices. Here are several more.

Symmetric skew lattices

A skew lattice S is symmetric if for any $x, y \in S$ , $x \wedge y = y \wedge x$ if and only if $x \vee y = y \vee x$. Occurrences of commutation are thus unambiguous for such skew lattices, with subsets of pairwise commuting elements generating commutative subalgebras, i.e., sublattices. (This is not true for skew lattices in general.) Equational bases for this subvariety, first given by Spinks are: $x \vee y \vee (x \wedge y) = (y \wedge x) \vee y \vee x$ and $x \wedge y \wedge (x \vee y) = (y \vee x) \wedge y \wedge x$. A lattice section of a skew lattice $S$ is a sublattice $T$ of $S$ meeting each $D$-class of $S$ at a single element. $T$ is thus an internal copy of the lattice $S/ D$ with the composition $T \subseteq S \rightarrow S/D$ being an isomorphism. All symmetric skew lattices for which $|S/D| \leq \aleph_0$ admit a lattice section. Symmetric or not, having a lattice section $T$ guarantees that $S$ also has internal copies of $S/ L$ and $S/ R$ given respectively by $T [R] = \bigcup_{t\in T} R_t$ and $T [L] = \bigcup_{t\in T} L_t$, where $R_t$ and $Lt$ are the $R$ and $L$ congruence classes of $t$ in $T$ . Thus $T [ R] \subseteq S \rightarrow S/L$ and $T [L] \subseteq S \rightarrow S/R$ are isomorphisms. This leads to a commuting diagram of embedding dualizing the preceding Kimura diagram.

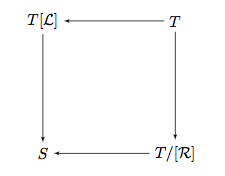

Cancellative skew lattices

A skew lattice is cancellative if $x \vee y = x \vee z$ and $x \wedge y = x \wedge z$ implies $y = z$ and likewise $x \vee z = y \vee z$ and $x \wedge z = y \wedge z$ implies $x = y$. Cancellatice skew lattices are symmetric and can be shown to form a variety. Unlike lattices, they need not be distributive, and conversely.

Distributive skew lattices

Distributive skew lattices are determined by the identities:

$x \wedge (y \vee z ) \wedge x = (x \wedge y \wedge x) \vee (x \wedge z \wedge x)$ (D1)

$x \vee (y \wedge z ) \vee x = (x \vee y \vee x) \wedge (x \vee z \vee x).$ (D'1)

Unlike lattices, (D1) and (D'1) are not equivalent in general for skew lattices, but they are for symmetric skew lattices. The condition (D1) can be strengthened to

$x \wedge (y \vee z ) \wedge w = (x \wedge y \wedge w) \vee (x \wedge z \wedge w)$ (D2)

in which case (D'1) is a consequence. A skew lattice $S$ satisfies both (D2) and its dual, $x \vee (y \wedge z ) \vee w = (x \vee y \vee w) \wedge (x \vee z \vee w)$, if and only if it factors as the product of a distributive lattice and a rectangular skew lattice. In this latter case (D2) can be strengthened to

$x \wedge (y \vee z ) = (x \wedge y) \vee (x \wedge z )$ and $(y \vee z ) \wedge w = (y \wedge w) \vee (z \wedge w)$. (D3)

On its own, (D3) is equivalent to (D2) when symmetry is added. We thus have six subvarieties of skew lattices determined respectively by (D1), (D2), (D3) and their duals.

Normal skew lattices

As seen above, $\wedge$ and $\vee$ satisfy the identity $xyxzx = xyzx$. Bands satisfying the stronger identity, $xyzx = xzyx$, are called normal. A skew lattice is normal skew if it satisfies

$x \wedge y \wedge z \wedge x = x \wedge z \wedge y \wedge x. (N)$

For each element a in a normal skew lattice $S$, the set $a \wedge S \wedge a$ defined by {$a \wedge x \wedge a | x \in S$} or equivalently {$x \in S | x\leq a$} is a sublattice of $S$, and conversely. (Thus normal skew lattices have also been called local lattices.) When both $\wedge$ and $\vee$ are normal, $S$ splits isomorphically into a product $T \times D$ of a lattice $T$ and a rectangular skew lattice $D$, and conversely. Thus both normal skew lattices and split skew lattices form varieties. Returning to distribution, $(D2) = (D1) + (N)$ so that $(D2)$ characterizes the variety of distributive, normal skew lattices, and (D3) characterizes the variety of symmetric, distributive, normal skew lattices.

Categorical skew lattices

A skew lattice is categorical if nonempty composites of coset bijections are coset bijections. Categorical skew lattices form a variety. Skew lattices in rings and normal skew lattices are examples of algebras in this variety. Let $a > b > c$ with $a \in A$, $b \in B$ and $c \in C$, $\varphi$ be the coset bijection from $A$ to $B$ taking $a$ to $b$, $\psi$ be the coset bijection from $B$ to $C$ taking $b$ to $c$ and finally $\chi$ be the coset bijection from $A$ to $C$ taking $a$ to $c$. A skew lattice $S$ is categorical if one always has the equality $\psi \circ \varphi = \chi$, i.e. , if the composite partial bijection $\psi \circ \varphi$ if nonempty is a coset bijection from a $C$ -coset of $A$ to an $A$-coset of $C$ . That is $(A \wedge b \wedge A) \cap (C \vee b \vee C ) = (C \vee a \vee C ) \wedge b \wedge (C \vee a \vee C ) = (A \wedge c \wedge A) \vee b \vee (A \wedge c \wedge A)$. All distributive skew lattices are categorical. Though symmetric skew lattices might not be. In a sense they reveal the independence between the properties of symmetry and distributivity.

== Skew Boolean algebras ==
A zero element in a skew lattice S is an element 0 of S such that for all $x \in S,$ $0 \wedge x = 0 = x \wedge 0$ or, dually, $0 \vee x = x = x \vee 0.$ (0)

A Boolean skew lattice is a symmetric, distributive normal skew lattice with 0, $(S ; \vee, \wedge, 0),$ such that $a \wedge S \wedge a$ is a Boolean lattice for each $a \in S.$ Given such skew lattice S, a difference operator \ is defined by x \ y = $x - x \wedge y \wedge x$ where the latter is evaluated in the Boolean lattice $x \wedge S \wedge x.$ In the presence of (D3) and (0), \ is characterized by the identities:

$y \wedge x \setminus y = 0 = x \setminus y \wedge y$ and $(x \wedge y \wedge x) \vee x \setminus y = x = x \setminus y \vee (x \wedge y \wedge x).$ (S B)

One thus has a variety of skew Boolean algebras $(S ; \vee, \wedge, \, 0)$ characterized by identities (D3), (0) and (S B). A primitive skew Boolean algebra consists of 0 and a single non-0 D-class. Thus it is the result of adjoining a 0 to a rectangular skew lattice D via (0) with $x \setminus y = x$, if $y = 0$ and $0$ otherwise. Every skew Boolean algebra is a subdirect product of primitive algebras. Skew Boolean algebras play an important role in the study of discriminator varieties and other generalizations in universal algebra of Boolean behavior.

== Skew lattices in rings ==
Let $A$ be a ring and let $E(A)$ denote the set of all idempotents in $A$. For all $x, y \in A$ set $x \wedge y = xy$ and $x \vee y = x + y - xy$.

Clearly $\wedge$ but also $\vee$ is associative. If a subset $S \subseteq E(A)$ is closed under $\wedge$ and $\vee$, then $(S, \wedge, \vee)$ is a distributive, cancellative skew lattice. To find such skew lattices in $E(A)$ one looks at bands in $E(A)$, especially the ones that are maximal with respect to some constraint. In fact, every multiplicative band in $()$ that is maximal with respect to being right regular (= ) is also closed under $\vee$ and so forms a right-handed skew lattice. In general, every right regular band in $E(A)$ generates a right-handed skew lattice in $E(A)$. Dual remarks also hold for left regular bands (bands satisfying the identity $xyx = xy$) in $E(A)$. Maximal regular bands need not to be closed under $\vee$ as defined; counterexamples are easily found using multiplicative rectangular bands. These cases are closed, however, under the cubic variant of $\vee$ defined by $x \nabla y = x + y + yx - xyx - yxy$ since in these cases $x \nabla y$ reduces to $yx$ to give the dual rectangular band. By replacing the condition of regularity by normality $(xyz w = xz yw)$, every maximal normal multiplicative band $S$ in $E(A)$ is also closed under $\nabla$ with $(S ; \wedge, \vee, /, 0)$, where $x/y = x - xyx$, forms a Boolean skew lattice. When $E(A)$ itself is closed under multiplication, then it is a normal band and thus forms a Boolean skew lattice. In fact, any skew Boolean algebra can be embedded into such an algebra. When A has a multiplicative identity $1$, the condition that $E(A)$ is multiplicatively closed is well known to imply that $E(A)$ forms a Boolean algebra. Skew lattices in rings continue to be a good source of examples and motivation.

== Primitive skew lattices ==
Skew lattices consisting of exactly two D-classes are called primitive skew lattices. Given such a skew lattice $S$ with $D$-classes $A > B$ in $S/D$, then for any $a \in A$ and $b \in B$, the subsets

$A \wedge b \wedge A =${$u \wedge b \wedge u : u \in A$} $\subseteq B$ and $B \vee a \vee B =$ {$v \vee a \vee v : v \in B$} $\subseteq A$

are called, respectively, cosets of A in B and cosets of B in A. These cosets partition B and A with $b \in A\wedge b\wedge A$ and $a \in B\wedge a\wedge B$. Cosets are always rectangular subalgebras in their $D$-classes. What is more, the partial order $\geq$ induces a coset bijection $\varphi : B \vee a \vee B \rightarrow A \wedge b \wedge A$ defined by:

$\phi (x) = y$ iff $x > y$, for $x \in B \vee a \vee B$ and $y \in A \wedge b \wedge A$.

Collectively, coset bijections describe $\geq$ between the subsets $A$ and $B$. They also determine $\vee$ and $\wedge$ for pairs of elements from distinct $D$-classes. Indeed, given $a \in A$ and $b \in B$, let $\varphi$ be the cost bijection between the cosets $B\vee a\vee B$ in $A$ and $A \wedge b \wedge A$ in $B$. Then:

$a\vee b = a\vee \varphi -1(b), b\vee a = \varphi -1(b)\vee a$ and $a\wedge b = \varphi(a)\wedge b , b\wedge a = b\wedge \varphi (a)$.

In general, given $a, c \in A$ and $b, d \in B$ with $a > b$ and $c > d$, then $a, c$ belong to a common $B$- coset in $A$ and $b, d$ belong to a common $A$-coset in $B$ if and only if $a > b // c > d$. Thus each coset bijection is, in some sense, a maximal collection of mutually parallel pairs $a > b$.

Every primitive skew lattice $S$ factors as the fibred product of its maximal left and right- handed primitive images $S/R \times_2 S/L$. Right-handed primitive skew lattices are constructed as follows. Let $A = \cup _i A_i$ and $B = \cup _j B_j$ be partitions of disjoint nonempty sets $A$ and $B$, where all $A_i$ and $B_j$ share a common size. For each pair $i, j$ pick a fixed bijection $\varphi_i,j$ from $A_i$ onto $B_j$. On $A$ and $B$ separately set $x\wedge y = y$ and $x\vee y = x$; but given $a \in A$ and $b \in B$, set

$a \vee b = a, b \vee a = a', a \wedge b = b$ and $b \wedge a = b'$

where $\varphi_{i,j}(a') = b$ and $\varphi_{i,j}(a) = b'$ with $a'$ belonging to the cell $A_i$ of $a$ and $b'$ belonging to the cell $B_j$ of $b$. The various $\varphi i,j$ are the coset bijections. This is illustrated in the following partial Hasse diagram where $|A_i| = |B_j| = 2$ and the arrows indicate the $\varphi_{i,j}$ -outputs and $\geq$ from $A$ and $B$.

One constructs left-handed primitive skew lattices in dual fashion. All right [left] handed primitive skew lattices can be constructed in this fashion.

== The coset structure of skew lattices ==
A nonrectangular skew lattice $S$ is covered by its maximal primitive skew lattices: given comparable $D$-classes $A > B$ in $S/D$, $A \cup B$ forms a maximal primitive subalgebra of $S$ and every $D$-class in $S$ lies in such a subalgebra. The coset structures on these primitive subalgebras combine to determine the outcomes $x\vee y$ and $x\wedge y$ at least when $x$ and $y$ are comparable under $\preceq$. It turns out that $x\vee y$ and $x\wedge y$ are determined in general by cosets and their bijections, although in a slightly less direct manner than the $\preceq$-comparable case. In particular, given two incomparable D-classes A and B with join D-class J and meet D-class $M$ in $S/D$, interesting connections arise between the two coset decompositions of J (or M) with respect to A and B.

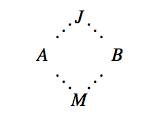

Thus a skew lattice may be viewed as a coset atlas of rectangular skew lattices placed on the vertices of a lattice and coset bijections between them, the latter seen as partial isomorphisms between the rectangular algebras with each coset bijection determining a corresponding pair of cosets. This perspective gives, in essence, the Hasse diagram of the skew lattice, which is easily drawn in cases of relatively small order. (See the diagrams in Section 3 above.) Given a chain of D-classes $A > B > C$ in $S/D$, one has three sets of coset bijections: from A to B, from B to C and from A to C. In general, given coset bijections $\varphi: A \rightarrow B$ and $\psi: B \rightarrow C$, the composition of partial bijections $\psi \varphi$ could be empty. If it is not, then a unique coset bijection $\chi: A \rightarrow C$ exists such that $\psi \varphi \subseteq \chi$. (Again, $\chi$ is a bijection between a pair of cosets in $A$ and $C$.) This inclusion can be strict. It is always an equality (given $\psi \varphi \neq \empty$) on a given skew lattice S precisely when S is categorical. In this case, by including the identity maps on each rectangular D-class and adjoining empty bijections between properly comparable D-classes, one has a category of rectangular algebras and coset bijections between them. The simple examples in Section 3 are categorical.

== See also ==
- Semigroup theory
- Lattice theory
