= List of order structures in mathematics =

In mathematics, and more specifically in order theory, several different types of ordered set have been studied. They include:

- Cyclic orders, orderings in which triples of elements are either clockwise or counterclockwise
- Lattices, partial orders in which each pair of elements has a greatest lower bound and a least upper bound. Many different types of lattice have been studied; see map of lattices for a list.
- Partially ordered sets (or posets), orderings in which some pairs are comparable and others might not be
- Preorders, a generalization of partial orders allowing ties (represented as equivalences and distinct from incomparabilities)
- Semiorders, partial orders determined by comparison of numerical values, in which values that are too close to each other are incomparable; a subfamily of partial orders with certain restrictions
- Total orders, orderings that specify, for every two distinct elements, which one is less than the other
- Weak orders, generalizations of total orders allowing ties (represented either as equivalences or, in strict weak orders, as transitive incomparabilities)
- Well-orders, total orders in which every non-empty subset has a least element
- Well-quasi-orderings, a class of preorders generalizing the well-orders

== See also ==
- Glossary of order theory
- List of order theory topics
