= Knowledge space =

Concept in education theory

In mathematical psychology and education theory, a knowledge space is a combinatorial structure used to formulate mathematical models describing the progression of a human learner. Knowledge spaces were introduced in 1985 by Jean-Paul Doignon and Jean-Claude Falmagne, and remain in extensive use in the education theory. Modern applications include two computerized tutoring systems, ALEKS and the defunct RATH.

Formally, a knowledge space assumes that a domain of knowledge is a collection of concepts or skills, each of which must be eventually mastered. Not all concepts are interchangeable; some require other concepts as prerequisites. Conversely, competency at one skill may ease the acquisition of another through similarity. A knowledge space marks out which collections of skills are feasible: they can be learned without mastering any other skills. Under reasonable assumptions, the collection of feasible competencies forms the mathematical structure known as an antimatroid.

Researchers and educators usually explore the structure of a discipline's knowledge space as a latent class model.

== Motivation ==
Knowledge Space Theory attempts to address shortcomings of standardized testing when used in educational psychometry. Common tests, such as the SAT and ACT, compress a student's knowledge into a very small range of ordinal ranks, in the process effacing the conceptual dependencies between questions. Consequently, the tests cannot distinguish between true understanding and guesses, nor can they identify a student's particular weaknesses, only the general proportion of skills mastered. The goal of knowledge space theory is to provide a language by which exams can communicate

- What the student can do and
- What the student is ready to learn.

== Model structure ==
Knowledge Space Theory-based models presume that an educational subject S can be modeled as a finite set Q of concepts, skills, or topics. Each feasible state of knowledge about S is then a subset of Q; the set of all such feasible states is K. The precise term for the information (Q, K) depends on the extent to which K satisfies certain axioms:

- A knowledge structure assumes that K contains the empty set (a student may know nothing about S) and Q itself (a student may have fully mastered S).
- A knowledge space is a knowledge structure that is closed under set union: if, for each topic, there is an expert in a class on that topic, then it is possible, with enough time and effort, for each student in the class to become an expert on all those topics simultaneously.
- A quasi-ordinal knowledge space is a knowledge space that is also closed under set intersection: if student a knows topics A and B; and student c knows topics B and C; then it is possible for another student b to know only topic B.
- A well-graded knowledge space or learning space is a knowledge space satisfying the following axiom:
  If S∈K, then there exists x∈S such that S\{x}∈K
  In educational terms, any feasible body of knowledge can be learned one concept at a time.

=== Prerequisite partial order ===
The more contentful axioms associated with quasi-ordinal and well-graded knowledge spaces each imply that the knowledge space forms a well-understood (and heavily studied) mathematical structure:

- A quasi-ordinal knowledge space can be associated with a distributive lattice under set union and set intersection. The name "quasi-ordinal" arises from Birkhoff's representation theorem, which explains that distributive lattices uniquely correspond to partial orders.
- A well-graded knowledge space is an antimatroid, a type of mathematical structure that describes certain problems solvable with a greedy algorithm.

In either case, the mathematical structure implies that set inclusion defines partial order on K, interpretable as an educational prerequirement: if a(⪯)b in this partial order, then a must be learned before b.

=== Inner and outer fringe ===
The prerequisite partial order does not uniquely identify a curriculum; some concepts may lead to a variety of other possible topics. But the covering relation associated with the prerequisite partial does control curricular structure: if students know a before a lesson and b immediately after, then b must cover a in the partial order. In such a circumstance, the new topics covered between a and b constitute the outer fringe of a ("what the student was ready to learn") and the inner fringe of b ("what the student just learned").

== Construction of knowledge spaces ==
In practice, there exist several methods to construct knowledge spaces. The most frequently used method is querying experts. There exist several querying algorithms that allow one or several experts to construct a knowledge space by answering a sequence of simple questions.

Another method is to construct the knowledge space by explorative data analysis (for example by item tree analysis) from data. A third method is to derive the knowledge space from an analysis of the problem solving processes in the corresponding domain.
