= Absorption law =

Law in algebra

In algebra, the absorption law or absorption identity is an identity linking a pair of binary operations.

Two binary operations, ¤ and ⁂, are said to be connected by the absorption law if:

a ¤ (a ⁂ b) = a ⁂ (a ¤ b) = a.

== Examples ==
=== Lattices ===
A set equipped with two commutative and associative binary operations $\scriptstyle \lor$ ("join") and $\scriptstyle \land$ ("meet") that are connected by the absorption law is called a lattice; in this case, both operations are necessarily idempotent (i.e. a $\scriptstyle \lor$ a = a and a $\scriptstyle \land$ a = a).

Examples of lattices include Heyting algebras and Boolean algebras, in particular sets of sets with union (∪) and intersection (∩) operators, ordered sets with min and max operations and integers with least common multiple and greatest common divisor.

=== Logic ===
In classical logic, and in particular Boolean algebra, the operations OR and AND, which are also denoted by $\scriptstyle \lor$ and $\scriptstyle \land$, satisfy the lattice axioms, including the absorption law. The same is true for intuitionistic logic.

=== Non-examples ===
The absorption law does not hold in many other algebraic structures, such as commutative rings, e.g. the field of real numbers, relevance logics, linear logics, and substructural logics. In the last case, there is no one-to-one correspondence between the free variables of the defining pair of identities.

== See also ==
- Absorption (logic)
- Lattice (order)
