= Metric lattice =

Example valuation function on the cube lattice which makes it a metric lattice.

In the mathematical study of order, a metric lattice L is a lattice that admits a positive valuation: a function v ∈ L → ℝ satisfying, for any a, b ∈ L, $v(a)+v(b)=v(a\wedge b)+v(a\vee b)$ and ${a>b}\Rightarrow v(a)>v(b)\text{.}$

== Relation to other notions ==
A lattice containing N5 (depicted) cannot be a metric one, since v(d)+v(c) = v(e)+v(a) = v(b)+v(c) implies v(d) = v(b), contradicting v(d) < v(b).

A Boolean algebra is a metric lattice; any finitely-additive measure on its Stone dual gives a valuation.

Every metric lattice is a modular lattice, c.f. lower picture. It is also a metric space, with distance function given by $d(x,y)=v(x\vee y)-v(x\wedge y)\text{.}$ With that metric, the join and meet are uniformly continuous contractions, and so extend to the metric completion (metric space). That lattice is usually not the Dedekind-MacNeille completion, but it is conditionally complete.

== Applications ==
In the study of fuzzy logic and interval arithmetic, the space of uniform distributions is a metric lattice. Metric lattices are also key to von Neumann's construction of the continuous projective geometry. A function satisfies the one-dimensional wave equation if and only if it is a valuation for the lattice of spacetime coordinates with the natural partial order. A similar result should apply to any partial differential equation solvable by the method of characteristics, but key features of the theory are lacking.
