= Semimodular lattice =

The centred hexagon lattice S_{7}, also known as D_{2}, is semimodular but not modular.

In the branch of mathematics known as order theory, a semimodular lattice, is a lattice that satisfies the following condition:

Semimodular law
a ∧ b <: a implies b <: a ∨ b.

The notation a <: b means that b covers a, i.e. a < b and there is no element c such that a < c < b.

An atomistic semimodular bounded lattice is called a matroid lattice because such lattices are equivalent to (simple) matroids. An atomistic semimodular bounded lattice of finite length is called a geometric lattice and corresponds to a matroid of finite rank.

Semimodular lattices are also known as upper semimodular lattices; the dual notion is that of a lower semimodular lattice. A finite lattice is modular if and only if it is both upper and lower semimodular.

A finite lattice, or more generally a lattice satisfying the ascending chain condition or the descending chain condition, is semimodular if and only if it is M-symmetric. Some authors refer to M-symmetric lattices as semimodular lattices.

A semimodular lattice is one kind of algebraic lattice.

== Birkhoff's condition ==
A lattice is sometimes called weakly semimodular if it satisfies the following condition due to Garrett Birkhoff:

Birkhoff's condition
If a ∧ b <: a and a ∧ b <: b,
then a <: a ∨ b and b <: a ∨ b.

Every semimodular lattice is weakly semimodular. The converse is true for lattices of finite length, and more generally for upper continuous (meets distribute over joins of chains) relatively atomic lattices.

== Mac Lane's condition ==
The following two conditions are equivalent to each other for all lattices. They were found by Saunders Mac Lane, who was looking for a condition that is equivalent to semimodularity for finite lattices, but does not involve the covering relation.

Mac Lane's condition 1
For any a, b, c such that b ∧ c < a < c < b ∨ a,
there is an element d such that b ∧ c < d ≤ b and a = (a ∨ d) ∧ c.
Mac Lane's condition 2
For any a, b, c such that b ∧ c < a < c < b ∨ c,
there is an element d such that b ∧ c < d ≤ b and a = (a ∨ d) ∧ c.

To see the equivalence of these two conditions, write condition 1 as P → R and condition 2 as Q → R where R is the common second line of each. By a < c and monotonicity of b ∨ a in a, P → Q and therefore (Q → R) → (P → R), i.e. 2 → 1. For the other direction, 1 → 2, to be false would require Q to hold while P and R are both false. We would then have a < c < b ∨ c whence c < b so c < b ∨ a, making P true, contradiction. This second direction is only of interest when c < b ∨ a is more work to prove than c < b ∨ c, otherwise condition 1 would be a sufficient test.

Every lattice satisfying Mac Lane's condition is semimodular. The converse is true for lattices of finite length, and more generally for relatively atomic lattices. Moreover, every upper continuous lattice satisfying Mac Lane's condition is M-symmetric.

== See also ==
- Antimatroid
