= Flat lattice =

Smallest lattice in which the elements of a set are incomparable

In mathematics, in the area of order theory, the flat lattice on a multielement set $X$ is the smallest lattice containing the elements of $X$ in which those elements are all pairwise incomparable; equivalently, it is the rank-3 lattice where $X$ is exactly the set of elements of intermediate rank.

== Formal definition ==
As a partially ordered set, the flat lattice on a multielement set $X$ is given by $(X \cup \{\top, \bot\}, \preceq)$ where
$$\forall a, b. a \preceq b \leftrightarrow a = \bot \lor a = b \lor b = \top.$$

As an algebraic structure, the flat lattice is equivalently given by $(X \cup \{\top, \bot\}, \sqcap, \sqcup)$ where
$$\forall a, b. a \sqcap b = \begin{cases}
\bot & \text{if } a = \bot \lor b = \bot\\
\bot & \text{if } a \in X \land b \in X \land a \ne b\\
a    & \text{if } a = b\\
a    & \text{if } b = \top\\
b    & \text{if } a = \top\\
\end{cases}$$
and symmetrically for join:
$$\forall a, b. a \sqcup b = \begin{cases}
\top & \text{if } a = \top \lor b = \top\\
\top & \text{if } a \in X \land b \in X \land a \ne b\\
a    & \text{if } a = b\\
a    & \text{if } b = \bot\\
b    & \text{if } a = \bot\\
\end{cases}$$

All of the cases in the algebraic definition follow from the general lattice axioms except for the $a \in X \land b \in X \land a \ne b$ cases; the poset definition implies them because elements of $X$ are incomparable, so $\bot$ (respectively $\top$) is the only remaining possibility for the value of the meet (respectively join).

Similarly, the algebraic definition implies the poset definition because no two distinct elements have a nontrivial meet or join, so the only relations that are possible are those that are mandatory from the lattice axioms—exactly the three disjuncts listed.

Finally, the flat lattice on $X$ may be defined implicitly, as the least lattice in which the elements of $X$ are incomparable. This too is equivalent: Consider any lattice on $X$ where the set's elements are pairwise incomparable. Because they are multiple and incomparable, none of them can be the lattice top or bottom, and since $X$ is nonempty, $\top$ and $\bot$ must be distinct. Therefore, $X \cup \{\top, \bot\}$ is the smallest possible set such a lattice could be defined on, and incomparability and the lattice axioms wholly determine the element relations to match the definitions above.

== The flat lattice of an empty set or of a singleton ==
The three definitions above, however, do not agree when $X$ is the empty set or a singleton, as the implicit definition would then collapse lattice elements. Possible resolutions are to exclude these cases (as above), to define the flat lattice of such a set to be the one-element lattice (in agreement with the implicit definition) or to define it as the two- or three-element lattice (in agreement with the explicit constructions).
