= Arrangement of hyperplanes =

Partition of space by hyperplanes

In geometry and combinatorics, an arrangement of hyperplanes is an arrangement of a finite set A of hyperplanes in a linear, affine, or projective space S. Questions about a hyperplane arrangement A generally concern geometrical, topological, or other properties of the complement, M(A), which is the set that remains when the hyperplanes are removed from the whole space. One may ask how these properties are related to the arrangement and its intersection semilattice. The intersection semilattice of A, written L(A), is the set of all subspaces that are obtained by intersecting some of the hyperplanes; among these subspaces are S itself, all the individual hyperplanes, all intersections of pairs of hyperplanes, etc. (excluding, in the affine case, the empty set). These intersection subspaces of A are also called the flats of A. The intersection semilattice L(A) is partially ordered by reverse inclusion.

If the whole space S is 2-dimensional, the hyperplanes are lines; such an arrangement is often called an arrangement of lines. Historically, real arrangements of lines were the first arrangements investigated. If S is 3-dimensional one has an arrangement of planes.

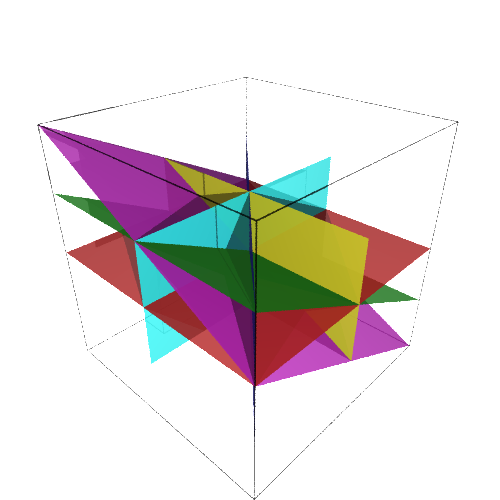
A hyperplane arrangement in space

== General theory ==
=== The intersection semilattice and the matroid ===
The intersection semilattice L(A) is a meet semilattice and more specifically is a geometric semilattice. If the arrangement is linear or projective, or if the intersection of all hyperplanes is nonempty, the intersection lattice is a geometric lattice. (This is why the semilattice must be ordered by reverse inclusion—rather than by inclusion, which might seem more natural but would not yield a geometric (semi)lattice.)

When L(A) is a lattice, the matroid of A, written M(A), has A for its ground set and has rank function r(B) := codim(f(B)), where B is any subset of A and f(B) is the intersection of the hyperplanes in B. In general, when L(A) is a semilattice, there is an analogous matroid-like structure called a semimatroid, which is a generalization of a matroid (and has the same relationship to the intersection semilattice as does the matroid to the lattice in the lattice case), but is not a matroid if L(A) is not a lattice.

=== Polynomials ===
For a subset B of A, let us define f(B) := the intersection of the hyperplanes in B; this is S if B is empty. The characteristic polynomial of A, written p_{A}(y), can be defined by

$$p_A(y) := \sum_B (-1)^{|B|}y^{\dim f(B)},$$

summed over all subsets B of A except, in the affine case, subsets whose intersection is empty. (The dimension of the empty set is defined to be −1.) This polynomial helps to solve some basic questions; see below. Another polynomial associated with A is the Whitney-number polynomial w_{A}(x, y), defined by

$$w_A(x,y) := \sum_B x^{n-\dim f(B)} \sum_C (-1)^{|C-B|}y^{\dim f(C)},$$

summed over B ⊆ C ⊆ A such that f(B) is nonempty.

Being a geometric lattice or semilattice, L(A) has a characteristic polynomial, p_{L(A)}(y), which has an extensive theory (see matroid). Thus it is good to know that p_{A}(y) = y^{i} p_{L(A)}(y), where i is the smallest dimension of any flat, except that in the projective case it equals y^{i + 1}p_{L(A)}(y). The Whitney-number polynomial of A is similarly related to that of L(A). (The empty set is excluded from the semilattice in the affine case specifically so that these relationships will be valid.)

=== The Orlik–Solomon algebra ===
The intersection semilattice determines another combinatorial invariant of the arrangement, the Orlik–Solomon algebra. To define it, fix a commutative subring K of the base field and form the exterior algebra E of the vector space

$$\bigoplus_{H \in A} K e_H$$

generated by the hyperplanes. A chain complex structure is defined on E with the usual boundary operator $\partial$. The Orlik–Solomon algebra is then the quotient of E by the ideal generated by elements of the form $e_{H_1} \wedge \cdots \wedge e_{H_p}$ for which $H_1, \dots, H_p$ have empty intersection, and by boundaries of elements of the same form for which $H_1 \cap \cdots \cap H_p$ has codimension less than p.

== Real arrangements ==
In real affine space, the complement is disconnected: it is made up of separate pieces called cells or regions or chambers, each of which is either a bounded region that is (the interior of) a convex polytope, or an unbounded convex polyhedral region. Each flat of A is also divided into pieces by the hyperplanes that do not contain the flat; these pieces are called the faces of A. The regions are faces because the whole space is a flat. The faces of codimension 1 may be called the facets of A. The face semilattice of an arrangement is the set of all faces, ordered by inclusion. Adding an extra top element to the face semilattice gives the face lattice.

In two dimensions (i.e., in the real affine plane) each region is a convex polygon (if it is bounded) or a convex polygonal region which goes off to infinity.

- As an example, if the arrangement consists of three parallel lines, the intersection semilattice consists of the plane and the three lines, but not the empty set. There are four regions, none of them bounded.
- If we add a line crossing the three parallels, then the intersection semilattice consists of the plane, the four lines, and the three points of intersection. There are eight regions, still none of them bounded.
- If we add one more line, parallel to the last, then there are 12 regions, of which two are bounded parallelograms.

Typical problems about an arrangement in n-dimensional real space are to say how many regions there are, or how many faces of dimension 4, or how many bounded regions. These questions can be answered just from the intersection semilattice. For instance, two basic theorems, from Zaslavsky (1975), are that the number of regions of an affine arrangement equals (−1)^{n}p_{A}(−1) and the number of bounded regions equals (−1)^{n}p_{A}(1). Similarly, the number of k-dimensional faces or bounded faces can be read off as the coefficient of x^{n−k} in (−1)^{n} w_{A} (−x, −1) or (−1)^{n}w_{A}(−x, 1).

Meiser (1993) designed a fast algorithm to determine the face of an arrangement of hyperplanes containing an input point.

Another question about an arrangement in real space is to decide how many regions are simplices (the n-dimensional generalization of triangles and tetrahedra). This cannot be answered based solely on the intersection semilattice. The McMullen problem asks for the smallest arrangement of a given dimension in general position in real projective space for which there does not exist a cell touched by all hyperplanes.

A real linear arrangement has, besides its face semilattice, a poset of regions, a different one for each region. This poset is formed by choosing an arbitrary base region, B_{0}, and associating with each region R the set S(R) consisting of the hyperplanes that separate R from B. The regions are partially ordered so that R_{1} ≥ R_{2} if S(R_{1}, R) contains S(R_{2}, R). In the special case when the hyperplanes arise from a root system, the resulting poset is the corresponding Weyl group with the weak order. In general, the poset of regions is ranked by the number of separating hyperplanes and its Möbius function has been computed (Edelman 1984).

Vadim Schechtman and Alexander Varchenko introduced a matrix indexed by the regions. The matrix element for the region $R_i$ and $R_j$ is given by the product of indeterminate variables $a_H$ for every hyperplane H that separates these two regions. If these variables are specialized to be all value q, then this is called the q-matrix (over the Euclidean domain $\mathbb{Q}[q]$) for the arrangement and much information is contained in its Smith normal form.

== Complex arrangements ==
In complex affine space, the complement is connected (all one piece) with holes where the hyperplanes were removed. A typical problem about an arrangement in complex space is to describe the holes.

The basic theorem about complex arrangements is that the cohomology of the complement M(A) is completely determined by the intersection semilattice. To be precise, the cohomology ring of M(A) (with integer coefficients) is isomorphic to the Orlik–Solomon algebra on Z.

The isomorphism can be described explicitly and gives a presentation of the cohomology in terms of generators and relations, where generators are represented (in the de Rham cohomology) as logarithmic differential forms

$$\frac{1}{2\pi i}\frac{d\alpha}{\alpha}.$$

with $\alpha$ any linear form defining the generic hyperplane of the arrangement.

== Technicalities ==
Sometimes it is convenient to allow the degenerate hyperplane, which is the whole space S, to belong to an arrangement. If A contains the degenerate hyperplane, then it has no regions because the complement is empty. However, it still has flats, an intersection semilattice, and faces. The preceding discussion assumes the degenerate hyperplane is not in the arrangement.

Sometimes one wants to allow repeated hyperplanes in the arrangement. We did not consider this possibility in the preceding discussion, but it makes no material difference.

== See also ==
- Supersolvable arrangement
- Oriented matroid
