= Geometric lattice =

Join-meet algebra on matroid flats

In the mathematics of matroids and lattices, a geometric lattice is a finite atomistic semimodular lattice, and a matroid lattice is an atomistic semimodular lattice without the assumption of finiteness. Geometric lattices and matroid lattices, respectively, form the lattices of flats of finite, or finite and infinite, matroids, and every geometric or matroid lattice comes from a matroid in this way.

== Definition ==
A lattice is a partially ordered set (poset) in which any two elements $x$ and $y$ have both a least upper bound, called the join or supremum, denoted by $x\vee y$, and a greatest lower bound, called the meet or infimum, denoted by $x\wedge y$.

The following definitions apply to posets in general, not just lattices, except where otherwise stated.

- For a minimal element $x$, there is no element $y$ such that $y < x$.
- An element $x$ covers another element $y$ (written as $x :> y$ or $y <: x$) if $x > y$ and there is no element $z$ distinct from both $x$ and $y$ so that $x > z > y$.
- A cover of a minimal element is called an atom.
- A lattice is atomistic if every element is the supremum of some set of atoms.
- A poset is graded when it can be given a rank function $r(x)$ mapping its elements to integers, such that $r(x)>r(y)$ whenever $x>y$, and also $r(x)=r(y)+1$ whenever $x :> y$.

When a graded poset has a bottom element, one may assume, without loss of generality, that its rank is zero. In this case, the atoms are the elements with rank one.

- A graded lattice is semimodular if, for every $x$ and $y$, its rank function obeys the identity

$$r(x)+r(y)\ge r(x\wedge y)+r(x\vee y). \,$$

- A matroid lattice is a lattice that is both atomistic and semimodular. A geometric lattice is a finite matroid lattice.

Many authors consider only finite matroid lattices, and use the terms "geometric lattice" and "matroid lattice" interchangeably for both.

== Lattices vs. matroids ==
The geometric lattices are equivalent to (finite) simple matroids, and the matroid lattices are equivalent to simple matroids without the assumption of finiteness (under an appropriate definition of infinite matroids; there are several such definitions). The correspondence is that the elements of the matroid are the atoms of the lattice and an element x of the lattice corresponds to the flat of the matroid that consists of those elements of the matroid that are atoms $a \leq x.$

Like a geometric lattice, a matroid is endowed with a rank function, but that function maps a set of matroid elements to a number rather than taking a lattice element as its argument. The rank function of a matroid must be monotonic (adding an element to a set can never decrease its rank) and it must be submodular, meaning that it obeys an inequality similar to the one for semimodular ranked lattices:

$$r(X)+r(Y)\ge r(X\cap Y)+r(X\cup Y)$$

for sets X and Y of matroid elements. The maximal sets of a given rank are called flats. The intersection of two flats is again a flat, defining a greatest lower bound operation on pairs of flats; one can also define a least upper bound of a pair of flats to be the (unique) maximal superset of their union that has the same rank as their union. In this way, the flats of a matroid form a matroid lattice, or (if the matroid is finite) a geometric lattice.

Conversely, if $L$ is a matroid lattice, one may define a rank function on sets of its atoms, by defining the rank of a set of atoms to be the lattice rank of the lowest upper bound of the set. This rank function is necessarily monotonic and submodular, so it defines a matroid. This matroid is necessarily simple, meaning that every two-element set has rank two.

These two constructions, of a simple matroid from a lattice and of a lattice from a matroid, are inverse to each other: starting from a geometric lattice or a simple matroid, and performing both constructions one after the other, gives a lattice or matroid that is isomorphic to the original one.

== Duality ==
There are two different natural notions of duality for a geometric lattice $L$: the dual matroid, which has as its basis sets the complements of the bases of the matroid corresponding to $L$, and the dual lattice, the lattice that has the same elements as $L$ in the reverse order. They are not the same, and indeed the dual lattice is generally not itself a geometric lattice: the property of being (upper) semimodular is not preserved by order-reversal. A simple example of a geometric lattice whose dual lattice is not geometric is the lattice of flats of the uniform matroid of rank 3 with 4 elements. Cheung (1974) defines the adjoint of a geometric lattice $L$ (or of the matroid defined from it) to be a minimal geometric lattice into which the dual lattice of $L$ is order-embedded. Some matroids do not have adjoints; an example is the Vámos matroid.

== Additional properties ==
Every interval of a geometric lattice (the subset of the lattice between given lower and upper bound elements) is itself geometric; taking an interval of a geometric lattice corresponds to forming a minor of the associated matroid. Geometric lattices are complemented, and because of the interval property they are also relatively complemented.

Every finite lattice is a sublattice of a geometric lattice.
