= Koszul algebra =

Process in mathematics

In abstract algebra, a Koszul algebra $R$ is a graded $k$-algebra over which the ground field $k$ has a linear minimal graded free resolution, i.e., there exists an exact sequence:

$$\cdots \rightarrow (R(-i))^{b_i} \rightarrow \cdots \rightarrow (R(-2))^{b_2} \rightarrow (R(-1))^{b_1} \rightarrow R \rightarrow k \rightarrow 0.$$

for some nonnegative integers $b_i$. Here $R(-j)$ is the graded algebra $R$ with grading shifted up by $j$, i.e. $R(-j)_i = R_{i-j}$, and the exponent $b_i$ refers to the $b_i$-fold direct sum. Choosing bases for the free modules in the resolution, the chain maps are given by matrices, and the definition requires the matrix entries to be zero or linear forms.

An example of a Koszul algebra is a polynomial ring over a field, for which the Koszul complex is the minimal graded free resolution of the ground field. There are Koszul algebras whose ground fields have infinite minimal graded free resolutions, e.g, $R = k[x,y]/(xy)$.

The concept is named after the French mathematician Jean-Louis Koszul.

== See also ==
- Koszul duality
- Complete intersection ring
