= Intersection (set theory) =

Set of elements common to all of some sets

- The intersection of two sets $A$ and $B,$ represented by circles. $A \cap B$ is in red.
- Type: Set operation
- Field: Set theory
- Statement: The intersection of $A$ and $B$ is the set $A \cap B$ of elements that lie in both set $A$ and set $B$.
- Symbolic statement: $A \cap B = \{ x: x \in A \text{ and } x \in B\}$

In set theory, the intersection of two sets $A$ and $B,$ denoted by $A \cap B,$ is the set containing all elements of $A$ that also belong to $B$ or equivalently, all elements of $B$ that also belong to $A.$ The notion of intersection as an algebraic operation with sets as operands has been generalized from geometry, where it is encountered in the case of geometric sets of points, such as individual points, lines (infinite uncountable sets of points), planes, etc.

== Notation and terminology ==
Intersection is written using the symbol "$\cap$" between the terms; that is, in infix notation. For example:
$$\{1,2,3\}\cap\{2,3,4\}=\{2,3\}$$
$$\{1,2,3\}\cap\{4,5,6\}=\varnothing$$
$$\Z\cap\N=\N$$
$$\{x\in\R:x^2=1\}\cap\N=\{1\}$$
The intersection of more than two sets (generalized intersection) can be written as:
$$\bigcap_{i=1}^n A_i$$
which is similar to capital-sigma notation.

For an explanation of the symbols used in this article, refer to the table of mathematical symbols.

== Definition ==
Intersection of three sets: $~A \cap B \cap C$

Intersections of the unaccented modern Greek, Latin, and Cyrillic (Russian alphabet) scripts, considering only the shapes of the letters and ignoring their pronunciation

Example of an intersection with sets

The intersection of two sets $A$ and $B,$ denoted by $A \cap B$, is the set of all objects that are members of both the sets $A$ and $B.$ In symbols:
$$A \cap B = \{ x: x \in A \text{ and } x \in B\}.$$

That is, $x$ is an element of the intersection $A \cap B$ if and only if $x$ is both an element of $A$ and an element of $B.$

For example:

- The intersection of the sets {1, 2, 3} and {2, 3, 4} is {2, 3}.
- The number 9 is not in the intersection of the set of prime numbers {2, 3, 5, 7, 11, ...} and the set of odd numbers {1, 3, 5, 7, 9, 11, ...}, because 9 is not prime.
- The intersection of two geometric sets of points such as two lines is a singleton set of one point for distinct non-parallel lines in the same plane.

=== Intersecting and disjoint sets ===
We say that $A$ intersects (meets) $B$ if there exists some $x$ that is an element of both $A$ and $B,$ in which case we also say that $A$ intersects (meets) $B$ at $x$. Equivalently, $A$ intersects $B$ if their intersection $A \cap B$ is an inhabited set, meaning that there exists some $x$ such that $x \in A \cap B.$

We say that $A$ and $B$ are disjoint if $A$ does not intersect $B.$ In plain language, they have no elements in common. $A$ and $B$ are disjoint if their intersection is empty, denoted $A \cap B = \varnothing.$

For example:

- the sets $\{1, 2\}$ and $\{3, 4\}$ are disjoint, while the set of even numbers intersects the set of multiples of 3 at the multiples of 6.
- two parallel lines in the same plane are disjoint.

== Algebraic properties ==
Binary intersection is an associative operation; that is, for any sets $A, B,$ and $C,$ one has

$$A \cap (B \cap C) = (A \cap B) \cap C.$$
Thus the parentheses may be omitted without ambiguity: either of the above can be written as $A \cap B \cap C$. Intersection is also commutative. That is, for any $A$ and $B,$ one has
$$A \cap B = B \cap A.$$
The intersection of any set with the empty set results in the empty set; that is, that for any set $A$,
$$A \cap \varnothing = \varnothing$$
Also, the intersection operation is idempotent; that is, any set $A$ satisfies that $A \cap A = A$. All these properties follow from analogous facts about logical conjunction.

Intersection distributes over union and union distributes over intersection. That is, for any sets $A, B,$ and $C,$ one has
$$\begin{align}
A \cap (B \cup C) = (A \cap B) \cup (A \cap C) \\
A \cup (B \cap C) = (A \cup B) \cap (A \cup C)
\end{align}$$
Inside a universe $U,$ one may define the complement $A^c$ of $A$ to be the set of all elements of $U$ not in $A.$ Furthermore, the intersection of $A$ and $B$ may be written as the complement of the union of their complements, derived easily from De Morgan's laws:$A \cap B = \left(A^{c} \cup B^{c}\right)^c$

== Arbitrary intersections ==
The most general notion is the intersection of an arbitrary nonempty collection of sets. If $M$ is a nonempty set whose elements are themselves sets, then $x$ is an element of the intersection of $M$ if and only if for every element $A$ of $M,$ $x$ is an element of $A.$ In symbols:
$$\left( x \in \bigcap_{A \in M} A \right) \Leftrightarrow \left( \forall A \in M, \ x \in A \right).$$

The notation for this last concept can vary considerably. Set theorists will sometimes write "$\bigcap M$", while others will instead write "${\bigcap}_{A \in M} A$". The latter notation can be generalized to "${\bigcap}_{i \in I} A_i$", which refers to the intersection of the collection $\left\{ A_i : i \in I \right\}.$ Here $I$ is a nonempty set, and $A_i$ is a set for every $i \in I.$

In the case that the index set $I$ is the set of natural numbers, notation analogous to that of an infinite product may be seen:
$$\bigcap_{i=1}^{\infty} A_i.$$

When formatting is difficult, this can also be written "$A_1 \cap A_2 \cap A_3 \cap \cdots$". This last example, an intersection of countably many sets, is actually very common; for an example, see the article on σ-algebras.

== Nullary intersection ==
Conjunctions of the arguments in parentheses The conjunction of no argument is the tautology (compare: empty product); accordingly the intersection of no set is the universe.

In the previous section, we excluded the case where $M$ was the empty set ($\varnothing$). The reason is as follows: The intersection of the collection $M$ is defined as the set (see set-builder notation)
$$\bigcap_{A \in M} A = \{x : \text{ for all } A \in M, x \in A\}.$$
If $M$ is empty, there are no sets $A$ in $M,$ so the question becomes "which $x$'s satisfy the stated condition?" The answer seems to be every possible $x$. When $M$ is empty, the condition given above is an example of a vacuous truth. So the intersection of the empty family should be the universal set (the identity element for the operation of intersection), but in standard (ZF) set theory, the universal set does not exist.

However, when restricted to the context of subsets of a given fixed set $X$, the notion of the intersection of an empty collection of subsets of $X$ is well-defined. In that case, if $M$ is empty, its intersection is $\bigcap M=\bigcap\varnothing=\{x\in X: x\in A \text{ for all }A\in\varnothing\}$. Since all $x\in X$ vacuously satisfy the required condition, the intersection of the empty collection of subsets of $X$ is all of $X.$ In formulas, $\bigcap\varnothing=X.$ This matches the intuition that as collections of subsets become smaller, their respective intersections become larger; in the extreme case, the empty collection has an intersection equal to the whole underlying set.

Also, in type theory $x$ is of a prescribed type $\tau,$ so the intersection is understood to be of type $\mathrm{set}\ \tau$ (the type of sets whose elements are in $\tau$), and we can define $\bigcap_{A \in \empty} A$ to be the universal set of $\mathrm{set}\ \tau$ (the set whose elements are exactly all terms of type $\tau$).

== See also ==
- Algebra of sets – Identities and relationships involving sets
- Cardinality – Size of a set in mathematics
- Complement – Set of the elements not in a given subset
- Intersection (Euclidean geometry) – Shape formed from points common to other shapes
- Intersection graph – Graph representing intersections between given sets
- Intersection theory – Branch of algebraic geometry
- List of set identities and relations – Equalities for combinations of sets
- Logical conjunction – Logical connective AND
- MinHash – Data mining technique
- Naive set theory – Informal set theories
- Symmetric difference – Elements in exactly one of two sets
- Union – Set of elements in any of some sets
