= Atom (order theory) =

In the mathematical field of order theory, an element a of a partially ordered set with least element 0 is an atom if 0 < a and there is no x such that 0 < x < a.

Equivalently, one may define an atom to be an element that is minimal among the non-zero elements, or alternatively an element that covers the least element 0.

== Atomic orderings ==
Fig. 2: The lattice of divisors of 4, with the ordering "is divisor of", is atomic, with 2 being the only atom and coatom. It is not atomistic, since 4 cannot be obtained as least common multiple of atoms.

Fig. 1: The power set of the set {x, y, z} with the ordering "is subset of" is an atomistic partially ordered set: each member set can be obtained as the union of all singleton sets below it.

Let <: denote the covering relation in a partially ordered set.

A partially ordered set with a least element 0 is atomic if every element b > 0 has an atom a below it, that is, there is some a such that b ≥ a :> 0. Every finite partially ordered set with 0 is atomic, but the set of nonnegative real numbers (ordered in the usual way) is not atomic (and in fact has no atoms).

A partially ordered set is relatively atomic (or strongly atomic) if for all a < b there is an element c such that a <: c ≤ b or, equivalently, if every interval [a, b] is atomic. Every relatively atomic partially ordered set with a least element is atomic. Every finite poset is relatively atomic.

A partially ordered set with least element 0 is called atomistic (not to be confused with atomic) if every element is the least upper bound of a set of atoms. The linear order with three elements is not atomistic (see Fig. 2).

Atoms in partially ordered sets are abstract generalizations of singleton sets in set theory (see Fig. 1). Atomicity (the property of being atomic) provides an abstract generalization in the context of order theory of the ability to select an element from a non-empty set.

== Coatoms ==
The terms coatom, coatomic, and coatomistic are defined dually. Thus, in a partially ordered set with greatest element 1, one says that

- a coatom is an element covered by 1,
- the set is coatomic if every b < 1 has a coatom c above it, and
- the set is coatomistic if every element is the greatest lower bound of a set of coatoms.
