= Intransitive (disambiguation) =

Intransitive can mean:

- the opposite of transitive, see Transitivity (disambiguation)
- Intransitivity, a mathematical property of binary relations
- Intransitive verb, a verb that does not allow an object
- Intransitive case, the grammatical case for arguments of intransitive verbs
- Intransitive Recordings, an independent American record label

== See also ==
- Nontransitive game
- Nontransitive dice
