= Transitivity =

Transitivity or transitive may refer to:

== Grammar ==
- Transitivity (grammar), a property regarding whether a lexical item denotes a transitive object
- Transitive verb, a verb which takes an object
- Transitive case, a grammatical case to mark arguments of a transitive verb

== Logic and mathematics ==
- Transitive group action
- Transitive relation, a binary relation in which if A is related to B and B is related to C, then A is related to C
- Syllogism, a related notion in propositional logic
- Intransitivity, properties of binary relations in mathematics
- Arc-transitive graph, a graph whose automorphism group acts transitively upon ordered pairs of adjacent vertices
- Edge-transitive graph, a graph whose automorphism group acts transitively upon its edges
- Vertex-transitive graph, a graph whose automorphism group acts transitively upon its vertices
- Transitive set, a set A such that whenever x ∈ A, and y ∈ x, then y ∈ A
- Topological transitivity, property of a continuous map for which every open subset U' of the phase space intersects every other open subset V, when going along trajectory

== Other ==
- Transitive Corporation, a computer software firm that developed QuickTransit cross-platform virtualization
- Transitive dependency, a functional dependency of database management which holds by virtue of transitive relation

== See also ==
- Intransitive (disambiguation)
