= Staged tree (mathematics) =

Class of statistical models

A staged tree is a probabilistic model for a process consisting of a sequence of discrete-valued events described by a tree diagram (also known as an event tree or probability tree). A staged tree places equality relationships on the conditional probability distributions of an event tree. These equality relationships are represented visually by the colour of the vertices to form a graphical model. A staged tree also has a more compact visual representation called the chain event graph.

Staged trees and chain event graphs were originally developed as a tool for expert elicitation. People often understand things through stories and experts commonly explain their domain via sequences of events and their knock-on effects. The staged tree and chain event graph provide a visual representation of such sequences of events and relate this to a class of probability distributions to create a formal probabilistic model. When there is sufficient data, staged trees can instead be used as a machine learning tool to find the story that best describes the data. In this way, new explanations for the evolution of the process can be discovered. They have also been used for causal analysis, have been extended to dynamic models that evolve over time and for modelling informed missing data.

== Event tree ==
Construction of a staged tree begins with drawing the event tree that describes all possible evolutions of the process. An event tree is an arborescence – a directed rooted tree graph with all edges pointing away from the root vertex. The root represents the beginning of the process while the leaves of the tree represent all possible end points of the process. All non-leaf vertices, including the root, are called situations and represent intermediate points in the process evolution. The edges in the tree are labelled with an identifier for the event it corresponds to.

Each situation and its outgoing edges is associated to a probability distribution, called the transition probabilities, which describe the probabilities of the next event given that the process reaches that situation. The transition probabilities are enough to uniquely determine the full probability distribution of the process.

An event tree is called x-compatible if it can be related to a sequence of discrete random variables (one for each layer of the tree) and all possible combinations of these variables have non-zero probability. Non-x-compatible trees instead allow structural zeros – when certain combinations of the variables occur with probability zero – or for the possible values of future events to depend on the past events.

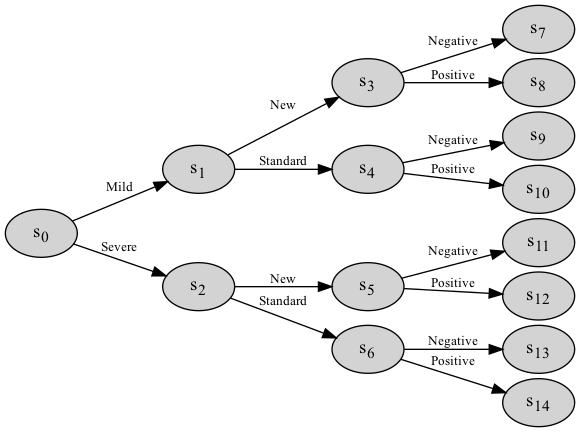
An example of an event tree for a simplified randomised controlled trial

Example

Consider a simplified setting for a randomised controlled trial for a new medical treatment. Patients are diagnosed to have either mild or severe symptoms and then randomly assigned either the new treatment or the standard treatment. The effects of the treatment are determined to have been positive or negative. This process can be represented by the x-compatible event tree displayed on the right.

== Staged tree ==
A staged tree is a probabilistic model that restricts the space of probability distributions in an event tree by specifying equality relationships between the transition probabilities of different situations. Specifically, if two situations are in the same stage then they share a common transition probability distribution. In other words, the situations are clustered into stages according to their transition probabilities.

Most generally, any two situations with the same number of outgoing edges can be in the same stage. However, the definition of a stage is often restricted so that only situations with the same outgoing edge labels can be in the same stage, with the equality relationship of the transition probabilities matching the edge labels. A staged tree is called stratified if only situations at the same layer of the tree can be in the same stage.

The set of all stages in a staged tree is described by a partition of the situations of the tree called the staging. A staged tree model is fully defined by the event tree and the staging, and is represented graphically by colouring the vertices of the event tree according to their stage membership. That is, all stages are assigned a colour and all situations in a stage are given this colour in the tree. Usually singleton stages – stages with only one situation – remain uncoloured.

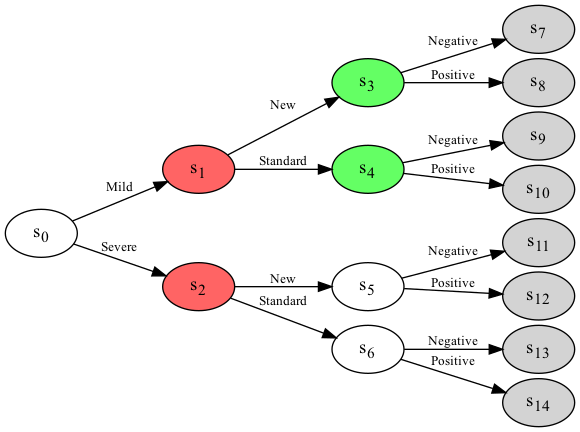
An example of a staged tree for a simplified randomised controlled trial

Example

Returning to the previous example, suppose we assume that:

1. The trial was correctly randomised so that the probability of a patient being assigned the new treatment does not depend on their symptoms.
2. The new treatment and standard treatment have equal performance for those with mild symptoms.

These two assumptions are represented in the staged tree shown to the right. Assumption 1 is reflected by situations $s_1$ and $s_2$ both being coloured in red, while assumption 2 is reflected by situations $s_3$ and $s_4$ both being coloured in green. Situations $s_5$ and $s_6$ are both uncoloured reflecting that no assumptions are made about their probability distributions.

== Chain event graph ==
A chain event graph is a more compact visual representation of a staged tree model. Two situations are in the same position if they are in the same stage and the future unfolding of the process is identical probabilistically from both situations. In other words, the subtrees beginning at the two situations are identical both in terms of topology and stage membership/colouring. A chain event graph is constructed by merging all vertices that are in the same position, as well as merging all leaf vertices into a single sink vertex.

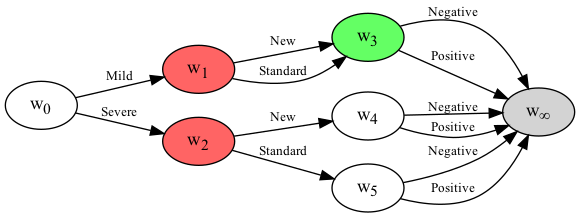
An example of a chain event graph for a simplified randomised controlled trial

Example

Returning to the previous example, situations $s_3$ and $s_4$ are in the same position and so can be merged in the chain event graph. Situations $s_1$ and $s_2$ are in the same stage, but are not in the same position because the sub-trees beginning at these vertices have different colourings. Hence they are not merged in the chain event graph. The subsequent chain event graph is shown on the right.

== Probability estimation ==
When estimating transition probabilities in an event tree, only samples that reach the relevant situation can be used. However, staged trees can enjoy a slight advantage because samples can be shared across any situations in the same stage since they are all used to estimate the same probability distribution. As long as the assumed staging is true, this results in larger sample sizes and therefore improved estimation of transition probabilities.

== Model selection ==
When a staged tree is not known a priori, it can instead be learned from data. That is, a staged tree model is selected that best represents the data. In this way, one can discover equalities in transition probabilities.

Model selection is then commonly done by combining a scoring function with a model search algorithm. The model search algorithm searches the set of possible models for the one with highest score. Standard choices for scoring function are the posterior model probability and the Bayesian information criterion, while choices for model search algorithm include agglomerative hierarchical clustering and hill climbing.

Often in model selection of staged trees, the underlying event tree is assumed to be fixed based on domain specific information (such as a temporal or causal ordering of the variables). An extension is when the event tree is not fixed and is included in the model selection. Many different event trees can describe the same dataset (for example, changing the order of variables in x-compatible trees), but each induce different transition probabilities and therefore different classes of staged tree models. For searching the space of possible event trees, a dynamic programming approach is available.

== Relation to Bayesian networks ==
Bayesian networks are a class of graphical models that are able to encode conditional independence relationships between groups of vertices. Similarly, the stages of a staged tree can be used to encode conditional independences. In fact, stratified x-compatible staged trees can be considered an extension of discrete Bayesian networks – every discrete Bayesian network can be represented by a stratified x-compatible staged tree. However, staged trees are also able to specify context specific conditional independencies which cannot be represented by a standard Bayesian network. In this way, the class of staged tree models is broader than that of the standard Bayesian network. Additionally, non-x-compatible staged trees can be used for processes that cannot be modelled by standard Bayesian networks.

== Software ==
Software for model selection and probability estimation using staged trees is available in R with the package stagedtrees and in Python with the package cegpy.

== Applications ==
Staged trees have been successfully applied in a number of areas including medicine and epidemiology, criminal investigations, migration pathways, transport, and law.

== Limitations ==
A main limitation of staged tree models is the types of data they can be used for. Specifically, the data must be able to be represented by an event tree which can only be done for finite sample spaces. When the data does not have a finite sample space, for example if it contains a continuous variable, the data cannot be represented by an event tree and therefore staged tree models cannot be directly applied. A simple solution to this is to discretise any variables with infinite sample space.

Another similar limitation of staged tree models is when the size of the finite sample space is large. This could happen because the tree contains many layers (long sequences of events) or when situations have many outgoing edges (many possible events). For example, an event tree of $N$ binary variables has $2^N$ root-to-leaf paths. The visual representation of a staged tree becomes harder to comprehend as it gets larger and therefore one of the main benefits of staged trees – the simple interpretation and visualisation – can be lost. Chain event graphs improve on this by providing a more compact visual representation, but still eventually suffer the same issue as the size of the tree increases.

This issue is more pronounced in model selection. For an event tree of $N$ binary variables, the number of possible stratified staged tree models is $\prod_{i=1}^N B(2^{N-1})$ where $B(m)$ is the $m$th Bell number. This means that an exhaustive model search is infeasible even for moderately sized trees necessitating the use of model search algorithms. Furthermore, model selection methods can be unstable when the sample size is small relative to the size of the tree.
