= Eric Harshbarger =

American puzzle designer, scrabble player, and mathematician

Eric C. Harshbarger
- Education: Auburn University (BS, 1992); Auburn University (MS, 1994)
- Occupation: Senior Lecturer
- Known for: Go First Dice, Top North American Scrabble Player
- Scientific career
- Fields: Recreational Mathematics
- Workplaces: Auburn University
- Website: http://www.ericharshbarger.org/

Eric C. Harshbarger (born c. 1971) is a Senior Lecturer of mathematics at Auburn University. He previously was an Alabama-based builder of large-scale Lego brick mosaics and sculptures. From around 2000 to 2006 he was commissioned to build for television shows and magazines for promotional purposes.

== Biography ==
Harshbarger grew up in Auburn, Alabama where he went to Auburn High School. In 1992, he obtained a Bachelor of Science from Auburn University in the Mathematics Department . In 1994, he also received a Master of Science from the Mathematics department at Auburn. In the late 1990s, he moved to California to pursue a job in the computer industry. In 1999, he returned to his home town of Auburn .

== Puzzles and games ==
Harshbarger is also well known for his work in puzzle and game design. His Digits in a Box toy has been produced by Popular Playthings since 2007. Wired magazine featured an optical illusion puzzle of his design in 2009. Collaborating with Mike Selinker, Harshbarger co-authored an optimization puzzle for the Maze of Games in 2015. From 2004 to 2017 he also has hosted one or more puzzle parties in and around his hometown of Auburn, Alabama. His puzzle TicTac's Tactics won Jury Honorable Mention at the 2018 International Nob Yoshigahara Puzzle Design Competition.

In the state of Alabama, Eric Harshbarger is ranked number one and is in the top 100 players in the United States for the game Scrabble.

== Mathematics ==
Harshbarger is a senior lecturer in the Department of Mathematics and Statistics at Auburn University. Harshbarger has been credited for significant research, development, and production of Go First Dice.
