= Go First Dice =

Dice intended to decide an order of play

Go First Dice are a set of dice in which, when rolled together, each die has an equal chance of showing the highest number, the second highest number, and so on.

The dice are intended for fairly deciding the order of play in, for example, a board game. The number on each side is unique among the set, so that no ties can be formed.

== Properties ==
There are three properties of fairness, with increasing strength:

- Go-first-fair - Each player has an equal chance of rolling the highest number (going first).
- Place-fair - When all the rolls are ranked in order, each player has an equal chance of receiving each rank.
- Permutation-fair - Every possible ordering of players has an equal probability, which also ensures it is "place-fair".

It is also desired that any subset of dice taken from the set and rolled together should also have the same properties, so they can be used for fewer players as well.

Configurations where all dice have the same number of sides are presented here, but alternative configurations might instead choose mismatched dice to minimize the number of sides, or minimize the largest number of sides on a single die.

Sets may be optimized for smallest least common multiple, fewest total sides, or fewest sides on the largest die. Optimal results in each of these categories have been proven by exhaustion for up to 4 dice.

== Configurations ==
=== Two players ===
The two player case is somewhat trivial. Two coins (2-sided dice) can be used:

Die 1	1	4
Die 2	2	3

=== Three players ===
An optimal and permutation-fair solution for three 6-sided dice was found by Robert Ford in 2010. There are several optimal alternatives using mismatched dice.

Numbers on each 6-sided die
Die 1	1	5	10	11	13	17
Die 2	3	4	7	12	15	16
Die 3	2	6	8	9	14	18

=== Four players ===
An optimal and permutation-fair solution for four 12-sided dice was found by Robert Ford in 2010. Alternative optimal configurations for mismatched dice were found by Eric Harshbarger.

Numbers on each 12-sided die
Die 1	1	8	11	14	19	22	27	30	35	38	41	48
Die 2	2	7	10	15	18	23	26	31	34	39	42	47
Die 3	3	6	12	13	17	24	25	32	36	37	43	46
Die 4	4	5	9	16	20	21	28	29	33	40	44	45

=== Five players ===
Several candidates exist for a set of five dice, but none is known to be optimal.

A not-permutation-fair solution for five 60-sided dice was found by James Grime and Brian Pollock. A permutation-fair solution for a mixed set of one 36-sided die, two 48-sided dice, one 54-sided die, and one 20-sided die was found by Eric Harshbarger in 2023. Note that some of these dice would not be able to have more than one rotation axis of order more than 2 (as regular polyhedra have) – see Point groups in three dimensions.

A permutation-fair solution for five 60-sided dice was found by Paul Meyer in 2023.

Numbers on each 60-sided die
Die 1	1	10	19	20	21	22	39	40	41	42	51	60	61	62	71	80	81	90	99	100
Die 1	109	118	119	120	121	122	123	132	133	150	151	168	169	178	179	180	181	182	183	192
Die 1	201	202	211	220	221	230	239	240	241	250	259	260	261	262	279	280	281	282	291	300
Die 2	2	9	13	16	25	28	33	36	45	48	52	59	65	68	72	79	85	86	94	95
Die 2	101	108	112	115	126	129	134	141	145	146	155	156	160	167	172	175	187	188	196	197
Die 2	203	210	212	219	225	226	234	235	244	247	251	258	266	267	274	275	283	290	294	297
Die 3	3	8	12	17	24	29	32	37	44	49	53	58	64	69	73	78	83	88	92	97
Die 3	102	107	111	116	125	130	135	140	143	148	153	158	161	166	171	176	185	190	194	199
Die 3	204	209	213	218	223	228	232	237	243	248	252	257	264	269	272	277	284	289	293	298
Die 4	4	7	11	18	26	27	34	35	43	50	54	57	63	70	74	77	84	87	93	96
Die 4	103	106	110	117	127	128	137	138	142	149	152	159	163	164	173	174	184	191	195	198
Die 4	205	208	214	217	224	227	231	238	245	246	254	255	263	270	271	278	286	287	295	296
Die 5	5	6	14	15	23	30	31	38	46	47	55	56	66	67	75	76	82	89	91	98
Die 5	104	105	113	114	124	131	136	139	144	147	154	157	162	165	170	177	186	189	193	200
Die 5	206	207	215	216	222	229	233	236	242	249	253	256	265	268	273	276	285	288	292	299

== See also ==
- Intransitive dice
