= Intransitive game =

Zero-sum game where competitions between strategies contain a cycle

An intransitive or non-transitive game is a zero-sum game in which pairwise competitions between the strategies contain a cycle. If strategy A beats strategy B, B beats C, and C beats A, then the binary relation "to beat" is intransitive, since transitivity would require that A beat C. The terms "transitive game" or "intransitive game" are not used in game theory.

A prototypical example of an intransitive game is the game rock, paper, scissors. In probabilistic games like Penney's game, the violation of transitivity results in a more subtle way, and is often presented as a probability paradox.

== Examples ==
- Rock, paper, scissors
- Penney's game
- Intransitive dice

== See also ==
- Stochastic transitivity
