= Tree diagram (probability theory) =

Diagram to represent a probability space in probability theory

Tree diagram for events $A$ and $B$.

In probability theory, a tree diagram may be used to represent a probability space.

A tree diagram may represent a series of independent events (such as a set of coin flips) or conditional probabilities (such as drawing cards from a deck, without replacing the cards). Each node on the diagram represents an event and is associated with the probability of that event. The root node represents the certain event and therefore has probability 1. Each set of sibling nodes represents an exclusive and exhaustive partition of the parent event.

The probability associated with a node is the chance of that event occurring after the parent event occurs. The probability that the series of events leading to a particular node will occur is equal to the product of that node and its parents' probabilities.

== Common usage ==
Probability trees are valuable due to the simple, visual delineation between additive and multiplicative relations between probabilistic events. Probabilities that do not lie on the same branch are to be added, and ones that do are to be multiplied. Probability trees also characterize relationships between multiple, conditional events.

== See also ==
- Decision tree
- Markov chain
- Staged tree
