= Intransitivity =

Property of mathematical relations

In mathematics, intransitivity (sometimes called nontransitivity) is a property of binary relations that are not transitive relations. That is, we can find three values $a$, $b$, and $c$ where the transitive condition does not hold.

Antitransitivity is a stronger property which describes a relation where, for any three values, the transitivity condition never holds.

Some authors use the term intransitive to refer to antitransitivity.

== Intransitivity ==
A relation is transitive if, whenever it relates some A to some B, and that B to some C, it also relates that A to that C. A relation is intransitive if it is not transitive. Assuming the relation is named $R$, it is intransitive if:

$$\lnot\left(\forall a, b, c: a R b \land b R c \implies a R c\right).$$

This statement is equivalent to
$$\exists a,b,c : a R b \land b R c \land \lnot(a R c).$$

For example, the inequality relation, $\neq$, is intransitive. This can be demonstrated by replacing $R$ with $\neq$ and choosing $a=1$, $b=2$, and $c=1$. We have $1\neq 2$ and $2\neq 1$ and it is not true that $1\neq 1$.

Notice that, for a relation to be intransitive, the transitivity condition just has to be not true at some $a$, $b$, and $c$. It can still hold for others. For example, it holds when $a=1$, $b=2$, and $c=3$, then $1\neq 2$ and $2\neq 3$ and it is true that $1\neq 3$.

For a more complicated example of intransitivity, consider the relation R on the integers such that a R b if and only if a is a multiple of b or a divisor of b. This relation is intransitive since, for example, 2 R 6 (2 is a divisor of 6) and 6 R 3 (6 is a multiple of 3), but 2 is neither a multiple nor a divisor of 3. This does not imply that the relation is antitransitive (see below); for example, 2 R 6, 6 R 12, and 2 R 12 as well.

An example in biology comes from the food chain. Wolves feed on deer, and deer feed on grass, but wolves do not feed on grass. Thus, the feed on relation among life forms is intransitive, in this sense.

== Antitransitivity ==
Antitransitivity for a relation says that the transitive condition does not hold for any three values.

In the example above, the feed on relation is not transitive, but it still contains some transitivity: for instance, humans feed on rabbits, rabbits feed on carrots, and humans also feed on carrots.

A relation is antitransitive if this never occurs at all. The formal definition is:
$$\forall a, b, c: a R b \land b R c \implies \lnot (a R c).$$

For example, the relation R on the integers, such that a R b if and only if a + b is odd, is antitransitive. If a R b and b R c, then either a and c are both odd and b is even, or vice-versa. In either case, a + c is even.

A second example of an antitransitive relation: the defeated relation in knockout tournaments. If player A defeated player B and player B defeated player C, A can have never played C, and therefore, A has not defeated C.

By transposition, each of the following formulas is equivalent to antitransitivity of R:
$$\begin{align}
&\forall a, b, c: a R b \land a R c \implies \lnot (b R c) \\[3pt]
&\forall a, b, c: a R c \land b R c \implies \lnot (a R b)
\end{align}$$

=== Properties ===
- An antitransitive relation is always irreflexive.
- An antitransitive relation on a set of ≥4 elements is never connex. On a 3-element set, the depicted cycle has both properties.
- An irreflexive and left- (or right-) unique relation is always anti-transitive. An example of the former is the mother relation. If A is the mother of B, and B the mother of C, then A cannot be the mother of C.
- If a relation R is antitransitive, so is each subset of R.

== Cycles ==
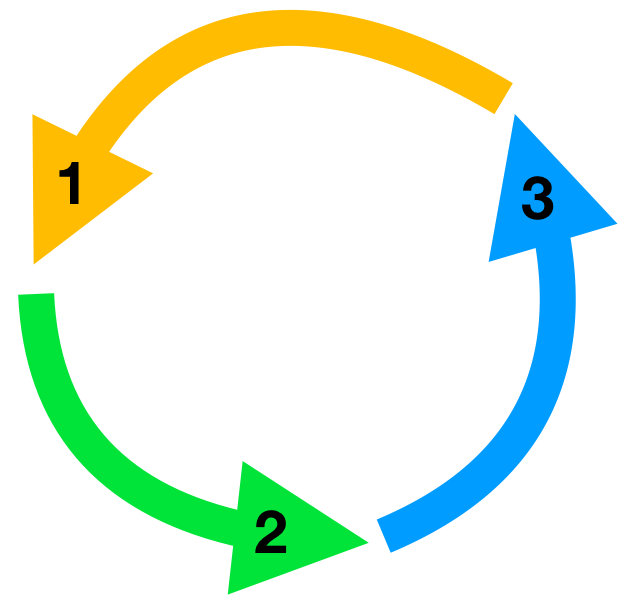
Sometimes, when people are asked their preferences through a series of binary questions, they will give logically impossible responses: 1 is better than 2, and 2 is better than 3, but 3 is better than 1.

The term intransitivity is often used when speaking of scenarios in which a relation describes the relative preferences between pairs of options, and weighing several options produces a "loop" of preference:

- A is preferred to B
- B is preferred to C
- C is preferred to A

Rock, paper, scissors; intransitive dice; and Penney's game are examples. Real combative relations of competing species, strategies of individual animals, and fights of remote-controlled vehicles in BattleBots shows ("robot Darwinism") can be cyclic as well.

Assuming no option is preferred to itself i.e. the relation is irreflexive, a preference relation with a loop is not transitive. For if it is, each option in the loop is preferred to each option, including itself. This can be illustrated for this example of a loop among A, B, and C. Assume the relation is transitive. Then, since A is preferred to B and B is preferred to C, also A is preferred to C. But then, since C is preferred to A, also A is preferred to A.

Therefore such a preference loop (or cycle) is known as an intransitivity.

Notice that a cycle is neither necessary nor sufficient for a binary relation to be not transitive. For example, an equivalence relation possesses cycles but is transitive. Now, consider the relation "is an enemy of" and suppose that the relation is symmetric and satisfies the condition that for any country, any enemy of an enemy of the country is not itself an enemy of the country. This is an example of an antitransitive relation that does not have any cycles. In particular, by virtue of being antitransitive the relation is not transitive.

The game of rock, paper, scissors is an example. The relation over rock, paper, and scissors is "defeats", and the standard rules of the game are such that rock defeats scissors, scissors defeats paper, and paper defeats rock. Furthermore, it is also true that scissors does not defeat rock, paper does not defeat scissors, and rock does not defeat paper. Finally, it is also true that no option defeats itself. This information can be depicted in a table:

	rock	scissors	paper
rock	0	1	0
scissors	0	0	1
paper	1	0	0

The first argument of the relation is a row and the second one is a column. Ones indicate the relation holds, zero indicates that it does not hold. Now, notice that the following statement is true for any pair of elements x and y drawn (with replacement) from the set {rock, scissors, paper}: If x defeats y, and y defeats z, then x does not defeat z. Hence the relation is antitransitive.

Thus, a cycle is neither necessary nor sufficient for a binary relation to be antitransitive.

== Occurrences in preferences ==
- Intransitivity can occur under majority rule, in probabilistic outcomes of game theory, and in the Condorcet voting method in which ranking several candidates can produce a loop of preference when the weights are compared (see voting paradox).
- Intransitive dice demonstrate that the relation "die X rolls a higher number than die Y more than half the time" need not be transitive.
- In psychology, intransitivity often occurs in a person's system of values (or preferences, or tastes), potentially leading to unresolvable conflicts.
- Analogously, in economics intransitivity can occur in a consumer's preferences. This may lead to consumer behaviour that does not conform to perfect economic rationality. Economists and philosophers have questioned whether violations of transitivity must necessarily lead to 'irrational behaviour' (see Anand (1993)).

== Likelihood ==
It has been suggested that Condorcet voting tends to eliminate "intransitive loops" when large numbers of voters participate because the overall assessment criteria for voters balances out. For instance, voters may prefer candidates on several different units of measure such as by order of social consciousness or by order of most fiscally conservative.

In such cases intransitivity reduces to a broader equation of numbers of people and the weights of their units of measure in assessing candidates.

Such as:

- 30% favor 60/40 weighting between social consciousness and fiscal conservatism
- 50% favor 50/50 weighting between social consciousness and fiscal conservatism
- 20% favor a 40/60 weighting between social consciousness and fiscal conservatism

While each voter may not assess the units of measure identically, the trend then becomes a single vector on which the consensus agrees is a preferred balance of candidate criteria.
