= Transitive relation =

Type of binary relation

- Type: Binary relation
- Field: Elementary algebra
- Statement: A relation $R$ on a set $X$ is transitive if, for all elements $a$, $b$, $c$ in $X$, whenever $R$ relates $a$ to $b$ and $b$ to $c$, then $R$ also relates $a$ to $c$.
- Symbolic statement: $\forall a,b,c \in X: (aRb \wedge bRc) \Rightarrow aRc$

In mathematics, a binary relation R on a set X is transitive if, for all elements a, b, c in X, whenever R relates a to b and b to c, then R also relates a to c.

Every partial order and every equivalence relation is transitive. For example, less than and equality among real numbers are both transitive: If a < b and b < c then a < c; and if x = y and y = z then x = z.

== Definition ==
Transitive binary relations

	Symmetric	Antisymmetric	Connected	Well-founded	Has joins	Has meets	Reflexive	Irreflexive	Asymmetric
			Total, Semiconnex					Anti- reflexive
Equivalence relation	✓	✗	✗	✗	✗	✗	✓	✗	✗
Preorder (Quasiorder)	✗	✗	✗	✗	✗	✗	✓	✗	✗
Partial order	✗	✓	✗	✗	✗	✗	✓	✗	✗
Total preorder	✗	✗	✓	✗	✗	✗	✓	✗	✗
Total order	✗	✓	✓	✗	✗	✗	✓	✗	✗
Prewellordering	✗	✗	✓	✓	✗	✗	✓	✗	✗
Well-quasi-ordering	✗	✗	✗	✓	✗	✗	✓	✗	✗
Well-ordering	✗	✓	✓	✓	✗	✗	✓	✗	✗
Lattice	✗	✓	✗	✗	✓	✓	✓	✗	✗
Join-semilattice	✗	✓	✗	✗	✓	✗	✓	✗	✗
Meet-semilattice	✗	✓	✗	✗	✗	✓	✓	✗	✗
Strict partial order	✗	✓	✗	✗	✗	✗	✗	✓	✓
Strict weak order	✗	✓	✗	✗	✗	✗	✗	✓	✓
Strict total order	✗	✓	✓	✗	✗	✗	✗	✓	✓
	Symmetric	Antisymmetric	Connected	Well-founded	Has joins	Has meets	Reflexive	Irreflexive	Asymmetric
Definitions, for all $a, b$ and $S\neq\varnothing :$	$$\begin{align}&aRb \\ \Rightarrow{} &bRa\end{align}$$	$$\begin{align}aRb\text{ and }&bRa \\ \Rightarrow a ={} &b\end{align}$$	$$\begin{align}a \neq{} &b \Rightarrow \\ aRb\text{ or }&bRa\end{align}$$	$$\begin{align}\min S \\ \text{exists}\end{align}$$	$$\begin{align}a \vee b \\ \text{exists}\end{align}$$	$$\begin{align}a \wedge b \\ \text{exists}\end{align}$$	$aRa$	$\text{not }aRa$	$$\begin{align}aRb \Rightarrow \\ \text{not }bRa\end{align}$$

✓ indicates that the column's property is always true for the row's term (at the very left), while ✗ indicates that the property is not guaranteed
in general (it might, or might not, hold). For example, that every equivalence relation is symmetric, but not necessarily antisymmetric,
is indicated by ✓ in the "Symmetric" column and ✗ in the "Antisymmetric" column, respectively.

All definitions tacitly require the homogeneous relation $R$ be transitive: for all $a, b, c,$ if $aRb$ and $bRc$ then $aRc.$
A term's definition may require additional properties that are not listed in this table.

A homogeneous relation R on the set X is a transitive relation if,

for all a, b, c ∈ X, if a R b and b R c, then a R c.

Or in terms of first-order logic:

$$\forall a,b,c \in X: (aRb \wedge bRc) \Rightarrow aRc$$,

where a R b is the infix notation for (a, b) ∈ R.

== Examples ==
As a non-mathematical example, the relation "is an ancestor of" is transitive. For example, if Amy is an ancestor of Becky, and Becky is an ancestor of Carrie, then Amy is also an ancestor of Carrie.

On the other hand, "is the birth mother of" is not a transitive relation, because if Alice is the birth mother of Brenda, and Brenda is the birth mother of Claire, then it does not follow that Alice is the birth mother of Claire. In fact, this relation is antitransitive: Alice can never be the birth mother of Claire.

Non-transitive, non-antitransitive relations include sports fixtures (playoff schedules), 'knows' and 'talks to'.

The examples "is greater than", "is at least as great as", and "is equal to" (equality) are transitive relations on various sets. As are the set of real numbers or the set of natural numbers:

whenever x > y and y > z, then also x > z
whenever x ≥ y and y ≥ z, then also x ≥ z
whenever x = y and y = z, then also x = z.

More examples of transitive relations:

- "is a subset of" (set inclusion, a relation on sets)
- "divides" (divisibility, a relation on natural numbers)
- "implies" (implication, symbolized by "⇒", a relation on propositions)

Examples of non-transitive relations:

- "is the successor of" (a relation on natural numbers)
- "is a member of the set" (symbolized as "∈")
- "is perpendicular to" (a relation on lines in Euclidean geometry)

The empty relation on any set $X$ is transitive because there are no elements $a,b,c \in X$ such that $aRb$ and $bRc$, and hence the transitivity condition is vacuously true. A relation R containing only one ordered pair is also transitive: if the ordered pair is of the form $(x, x)$ for some $x \in X$ the only such elements $a,b,c \in X$ are $a=b=c=x$, and indeed in this case $aRc$, while if the ordered pair is not of the form $(x, x)$ then there are no such elements $a,b,c \in X$ and hence $R$ is vacuously transitive.

Vacuous transitivity is transitivity when in a relation there are no ordered pairs of the form (a,b) and (b,c).

== Properties ==
=== Closure properties ===
- The converse (inverse) of a transitive relation is always transitive. For instance, knowing that "is a subset of" is transitive and "is a superset of" is its converse, one can conclude that the latter is transitive as well.
- The intersection of two transitive relations is always transitive. For instance, knowing that "was born before" and "has the same first name as" are transitive, one can conclude that "was born before and also has the same first name as" is also transitive.
- The union of two transitive relations need not be transitive. For instance, "was born before or has the same first name as" is not a transitive relation, since e.g. Herbert Hoover is related to Franklin D. Roosevelt, who is in turn related to Franklin Pierce, while Hoover is not related to Franklin Pierce.
- The complement of a transitive relation need not be transitive. For instance, while "equal to" is transitive, "not equal to" is only transitive on sets with at most one element.

=== Other properties ===
A transitive relation is asymmetric if and only if it is irreflexive.

A transitive relation need not be reflexive. When it is, it is called a preorder. For example, on set X = {1,2,3}:

- R = { (1,1), (2,2), (3,3), (1,3), (3,2) } is reflexive, but not transitive, as the pair (1,2) is absent,
- R = { (1,1), (2,2), (3,3), (1,3) } is reflexive as well as transitive, so it is a preorder,
- R = { (1,1), (2,2), (3,3) } is reflexive as well as transitive, another preorder,
- R = { (1,2), (2,3), (1,3) } is transitive, but not reflexive.

As a counter example, the relation $<$ on the real numbers is transitive, but not reflexive.

== Transitive extensions and transitive closure ==
Let R be a binary relation on set X. The transitive extension of R, denoted R_{1}, is the smallest binary relation on X such that R_{1} contains R, and if (a, b) ∈ R and (b, c) ∈ R then (a, c) ∈ R_{1}. For example, suppose X is a set of towns, some of which are connected by roads. Let R be the relation on towns where (A, B) ∈ R if there is a road directly linking town A and town B. This relation need not be transitive. The transitive extension of this relation can be defined by (A, C) ∈ R_{1} if you can travel between towns A and C by using at most two roads.

If a relation is transitive then its transitive extension is itself, that is, if R is a transitive relation then R_{1} = R.

The transitive extension of R_{1} would be denoted by R_{2}, and continuing in this way, in general, the transitive extension of R_{i} would be R_{i + 1}. The transitive closure of R, denoted by R* or R^{∞} is the set union of R, R_{1}, R_{2}, ... .

The transitive closure of a relation is a transitive relation.

The relation "is the birth parent of" on a set of people is not a transitive relation. However, in biology the need often arises to consider birth parenthood over an arbitrary number of generations: the relation "is a birth ancestor of" is a transitive relation and it is the transitive closure of the relation "is the birth parent of".

For the example of towns and roads above, (A, C) ∈ R* provided you can travel between towns A and C using any number of roads.

== Relation types that require transitivity ==
- Preorder – a reflexive and transitive relation
- Partial order – an antisymmetric preorder
- Total preorder – a connected (formerly called total) preorder
- Equivalence relation – a symmetric preorder
- Strict weak ordering – a strict partial order in which incomparability is an equivalence relation
- Total ordering – a connected (total), antisymmetric, and transitive relation

== Counting transitive relations ==
No general formula that counts the number of transitive relations on a finite set (sequence A006905 in the OEIS) is known. However, there is a formula for finding the number of relations that are simultaneously reflexive, symmetric, and transitive – in other words, equivalence relations – (sequence A000110 in the OEIS), those that are symmetric and transitive, those that are symmetric, transitive, and antisymmetric, and those that are total, transitive, and antisymmetric. Pfeiffer has made some progress in this direction, expressing relations with combinations of these properties in terms of each other, but still calculating any one is difficult. See also Brinkmann and McKay (2005) and Mala (2022).

Since the reflexivization of any transitive relation is a preorder, the number of transitive relations on an n-element set is at most the 2^{n}-fold of the number of preorders, thus it is asymptotically $2^{(1/4+o(1))n^2}$ by results of Kleitman and Rothschild.

Number of n-element binary relations of different types
Elements	Any	Transitive	Reflexive	Symmetric	Preorder	Partial order	Total preorder	Total order	Equivalence relation
0	1	1	1	1	1	1	1	1	1
1	2	2	1	2	1	1	1	1	1
2	16	13	4	8	4	3	3	2	2
3	512	171	64	64	29	19	13	6	5
4	65,536	3,994	4,096	1,024	355	219	75	24	15
n	2^{n^{2}}		2^{n(n−1)}	2^{n(n+1)/2}			∑^{n}_{k=0} k!S(n, k)	n!	∑^{n}_{k=0} S(n, k)
OEIS	A002416	A006905	A053763	A006125	A000798	A001035	A000670	A000142	A000110

Note that S(n, k) refers to Stirling numbers of the second kind.

== Related properties ==
The Rock–paper–scissors game is based on an intransitive and antitransitive relation "x beats y".

A relation R is called intransitive if it is not transitive, that is, if xRy and yRz, but not xRz, for some x, y, z. In contrast, a relation R is called antitransitive if xRy and yRz always implies that xRz does not hold. For example, the relation defined by xRy if xy is an even number is intransitive, but not antitransitive. The relation defined by xRy if x is even and y is odd is both transitive and antitransitive. The relation defined by xRy if x is the successor number of y is both intransitive and antitransitive. Unexpected examples of intransitivity arise in situations such as political questions or group preferences.

Generalized to stochastic versions (stochastic transitivity), the study of transitivity finds applications of in decision theory, psychometrics and utility models.

A quasitransitive relation is another generalization; it is required to be transitive only on its non-symmetric part. Such relations are used in social choice theory or microeconomics.

Proposition: If R is a univalent, then R;R^{T} is transitive.

proof: Suppose $x R;R^T y R;R^T z.$ Then there are a and b such that $x R a R^T y R b R^T z .$ Since R is univalent, yRb and aR^{T}y imply a=b. Therefore xRaR^{T}z, hence xR;R^{T}z and R;R^{T} is transitive.

Corollary: If R is univalent, then R;R^{T} is an equivalence relation on the domain of R.

proof: R;R^{T} is symmetric and reflexive on its domain. With univalence of R, the transitive requirement for equivalence is fulfilled.

== See also ==
- Transitive reduction
- Intransitive dice
- Rational choice theory
- Hypothetical syllogism – transitivity of the material conditional
