= Klaus Wilhelm Roggenkamp =

German mathematician (1940–2021)

Klaus Wilhelm Roggenkamp (24 December 1940 – 23 July 2021) was a German mathematician, specializing in algebra.

== Education and career ==
As an undergraduate, Roggenkamp studied mathematics from 1960 to 1964 at the University of Giessen. There in 1967 he received his PhD. His thesis Darstellungen endlicher Gruppen in Polynombereichen (Representations of finite groups in polynomial integral domains) was written under the supervision of Hermann Boerner. As a postdoc, Roggenkamp was at the University of Illinois at Urbana-Champaign, where he studied under Irving Reiner, and at the University of Montreal. After four years as a professor at Bielefeld University, he was appointed to the chair of algebra at the University of Stuttgart.

Roggenkamp and Leonard Lewy Scott collaborated on a long series of papers on the groups of units of integral group rings, dealing with problems connected with the "integral isomorphism problem", which was proposed by Graham Higman in his 1940 doctoral dissertation at the University of Oxford. In 1986 Roggenkamp and Scott proved their most famous theorem (published in 1987 in the Annals of Mathematics). Their theorem states that given two finite groups $G$ and $H$, if Z$G$ is isomorphic to Z$H$ then $G$ is isomorphic to $H$, in the case where $G$ and $H$ are finite p-groups over the p-adic integers, and also in the case where $G$ and $H$ are finite nilpotent groups. Their 1987 paper also established a very strong form of a conjecture made by Hans Zassenhaus. The papers of Roggenkamp and Scott were the basis for most developments which followed in the study of finite groups of units of integral group rings.

In 1988 Roggenkamp and Scott found a counterexample to another conjecture by Hans Zassenhaus — the conjecture was a somewhat strengthened form of the conjecture that the "integral isomorphism problem" always has an affirmative solution. Martin Hertweck, partly building on the techniques introduced by Roggenkamp and Scott for their counterexample, published a counterexample to the conjecture that the "integral isomorphism problem" can always be solved affirmatively.

A series of joint papers of Klaus Roggenkamp and Karl Gruenberg centers around homological considerations of groups and connections to homological questions of group rings. In particular, the authors studied the relation module of a group, i.e. the abelianised kernel of a minimal presentation of a group. Various applications were given, among others, to questions about units in integral group rings. Klaus Roggenkamp managed to clarify completely the structure of blocks of p-adic group rings with cyclic defect group, thus establishing an integral analogue of the celebrated theory of Brauer tree algebras. Many applications are known and more are on the way, from equivalences between derived categories to the inverse problem of Galois theory.
A new branch of representation theory is created by Klaus Roggenkamp’s most recent research on higher-dimensional orders. Motivated by recent developments in the representation theory of algebraic groups, algebraic combinatorics, Hecke algebras and quantum groups, Klaus Roggenkamp had started to study orders over two and higher-dimensional coefficient domains.

Roggenkamp was elected a member of the Akademie gemeinnütziger Wissenschaften zu Erfurt (Erfurt Academy of Sciences) and was made an honorary member of Ovidius University of Constanța in Romania.

== Selected publications ==
=== Articles ===
- Auslander, M.; Roggenkamp, K. W. (1972). "A characterization of orders of finite lattice type". Inventiones Mathematicae. 17: 79–84. Bibcode:1972InMat..17...79A. doi:10.1007/BF01390025. S2CID 121094091.
- Gruenberg, K. W.; Roggenkamp, K. W. (1975). "Decomposition of the Augmentation Ideal and of the Relation Modules of a Finite Group". Proceedings of the London Mathematical Society. s3-31 (2): 149–166. doi:10.1112/plms/s3-31.2.149. ISSN 0024-6115.
- Roggenkamp, K.W.; Schmidt, J.W. (1976). "Almost split sequences for integral group rings and orders". Communications in Algebra. 4 (10): 893–917. doi:10.1080/00927877608822144.
- Roggenkamp, K.W. (1977). "The construction of almost split sequences for integral group rings and orders". Communications in Algebra. 5 (13): 1363–1373. doi:10.1080/00927877708822223.
- Ringel, Claus Michael; Roggenkamp, Klaus W. (1979). "Diagrammatic methods in the representation theory of orders" (PDF). Journal of Algebra. 60 (1): 11–42. doi:10.1016/0021-8693(79)90106-6.
- Roggenkamp, Klaus; Scott, Leonard (1987). "Isomorphisms of p-adic Group Rings". Annals of Mathematics. 126 (3): 593–647. doi:10.2307/1971362. JSTOR 1971362.
- Roggenkamp, K. W. (1991). "The isomorphism problem for integral group rings of finite groups". Representation Theory of Finite Groups and Finite-Dimensional Algebras. pp. 193–220. doi:10.1007/978-3-0348-8658-1_7. ISBN 978-3-0348-9720-4.
- Roggenkamp, K.W. (1992). "Blocks of cyclic defect and green-orders". Communications in Algebra. 20 (6): 1715–1734. doi:10.1080/00927879208824426.
- Kimmerle, W.; Roggenkamp, K.W. (1993). "Projective limits of group rings". Journal of Pure and Applied Algebra. 88 (1–3): 119–142. doi:10.1016/0022-4049(93)90017-N.
- Roggenkamp, Klaus W.; Zimmermann, Alexander (1995). "Outer group automorphisms may become inner in the integral group ring". Journal of Pure and Applied Algebra. 103: 91–99. doi:10.1016/0022-4049(95)90113-Y.
- Roggenkamp, K. W. (1996). "Almost split sequences and triangles for artin algebras and orders". Proceedings of the Workshop at UNAM, Mexico, August 16–20, 1994. Canadian Mathematical Society Conference Proceedings, vol. 19. pp. 261–280. ISBN 9780821803967.
- Roggenkamp, Klaus W.; Kirichenko, Vladimir V.; Khibina, Marina A.; Zhuravlev, Viktor N. (2001). "Gorenstein Tiled Orders". Communications in Algebra. 29 (9): 4231–4247. doi:10.1081/AGB-100105998. S2CID 120994891.
- Khanduja, Sudesh K.; Popescu, N.; Roggenkamp, K. W. (2002). "On minimal pairs and residually transcendental extensions of valuations". Mathematika. 49 (1–2): 93–106. doi:10.1112/S0025579300016090.

=== Books ===
- Roggenkamp, K. W.; Huber-Dyson, Verena (1970). Lattices over Orders. Lecture Notes in Mathematics, 115. Springer. ISBN 9780387049311.
- Roggenkamp, Klaus W. (15 November 2006). Lattices over Orders II. Lecture Notes in Mathematics, 142. Springer Berlin Heidelberg. ISBN 978-3-540-36301-9. (reprint of 1970 1st edition)
  - Roggenkamp, K. W. (15 January 2014). Lattices over Orders II. Springer. ISBN 9783662197349. (2014 reprint)
- Reiner, Irving; Roggenkamp, K. W. (15 November 2006). Integral Representations: Topics in Integral Representation Theory. Integral Representations and Presentations of Finite Groups. Lecture Notes in Mathematics 744. Springer. ISBN 9783540350071. (reprint of 1979 original ISBN 3-540-09546-2)
- Roggenkamp, K. W. (1980). Integral representations and structure of finite group rings. Département de Mathématiques, Université de Montréal. Séminaire de Mathématiques Supérieures 71. Montreal: Presses de l'Université de Montréal. ISBN 2-7606-0485-3.
- Roggenkamp, K. W.; Taylor, Martin J. (6 December 2012). Group Rings and Class Groups. DMV-Seminar 18. Birkhäuser. ISBN 9783034886116. (reprint of 1992 original ISBN 3-7643-2734-0)

=== as editor ===
- Roggenkamp, Klaus W., ed. (October 1981). Integral Representations and Applications: Proceedings of a Conference Held at Oberwolfach, Germany, June 22-28, 1980. Springer. ISBN 978-3-540-10880-1. book table of contents at Springer website
- Roggenkamp, Klaus W.; Reiner, Irving, eds. (2006), Orders and their applications: Proceedings of a conference held in Oberwolfach, West Germany, June 3-9, 1984, Lecture Notes in Mathematics, Springer-Verlag, ISBN 9783540396017 (reprint of 1985 1st edition)
- Roggenkamp, K. W.; Ștefănescu, Mirela, eds. (31 August 2001). Algebra - Representation Theory. Springer. ISBN 9780792371137.
