= Schnee =

Schnee is a surname of German origin, meaning "snow". People with this name include:

- Ada Schnee (1872-1969), New Zealander-German writer and actress
- Bill Schnee (born 1947), American recording engineer and music producer
- Charles Schnee (1916–1963), American screenwriter
- Gary Schnee, American curler
- Heinrich Schnee (1871–1949), Governor of German East Africa during World War I
- Walter Schnee (1885–1958), German mathematician
- Weiss Schnee, a character in the animated web series RWBY
- Winter Schnee, the older sister of Weiss Schnee in the animated web series RWBY

== See also ==
- Schnee Eifel, a heavily wooded landscape in Germany's Central Uplands
