= Olivier Debarre =

French mathematician (born 1959)

Olivier Debarre (born 1959) is a French mathematician who specializes in complex algebraic geometry.

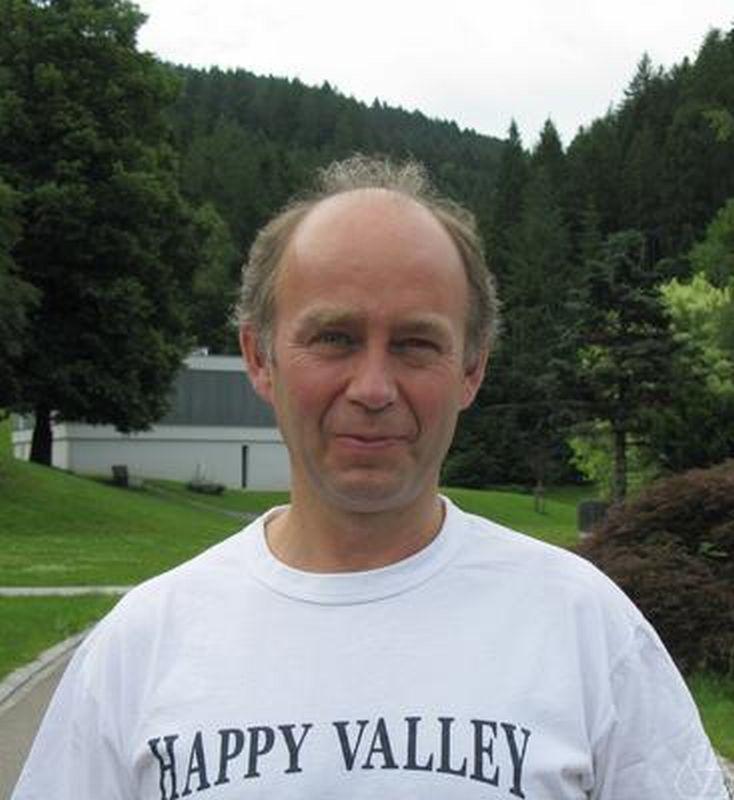
Olivier Debarre at Oberwolfach in 2012

From 1977 to 1981, Olivier Debarre attended the École Normale Supérieure (ENS) and he studied under Phillip Griffiths at Harvard University in 1981–1982. In 1987, he received his Ph.D. in a two-part thesis from the University of Paris XI. His "Thèse d´Etat", under Arnaud Beauville, was entitled Variétés de Prym, conjecture de la trisécante et ensembles d'Andreotti et Mayer and his "Seconde Thèse", under Michael Robert Herman, was entitled Conjugaison analytique à des rotations des difféomorphismes analytiques du cercle.

From 1982 to 1987, Debarre was a scientific researcher at the Centre national de la recherche scientifique (CNRS). He then moved to the United States, and was hired as an associate professor at the University of Iowa, where he taught from 1991 to 1994. Back in France in 1995, he became a professor at the University of Strasbourg, where he stayed until 2008. Since 2008, he has been teaching both at the University of Paris VII and at the École Normale Supérieure, where in 2009–2010 he was chair of the faculty.

In addition, he was a part-time professor at the École Polytechnique from 1997 to 2001. He was a visiting professor in 1999 at Harvard, in 2004 at the University of Michigan, in 2007 at the National University of Taiwan, in 2008 at the Korean Institute for Advanced Study, in 2008 at the Fudan University in Shanghai, and in 2009 at the Mathematical Sciences Research Institute (MSRI), in Berkeley, California. From 1999 to 2004 he was a junior member of the Institut Universitaire de France.

His areas of research include the Schottky problem, problems of Torelli type, Fano varieties, and Prym varieties.

Debarre has been an editor for the Mathematische Zeitschrift since 2005, and managing editor from 2007 to 2020. He was editor of the series Astérisque of the Société Mathématique de France from 1999 to 2009, and for the Annales Scientifiques de l'École Normale Supérieure in 2010–2011.

== Selected publications ==
- Complex Tori and Abelian Varieties. AMS. 2005. ISBN 9780821831656.
- Higher dimensional algebraic geometry. Springer Verlag, Universitext. 2001. ISBN 9780387952277.
- Debarre, Olivier (1989). "Le théorème de Torelli pour les intersections de trois quadriques". Inventiones Mathematicae. 95 (3): 507–528. Bibcode:1989InMat..95..507D. doi:10.1007/bf01393887. S2CID 120481990.
- The Schottky Problem: An Update, in Herbert Clemens, János Kollár (editors) Current Topics in Complex Algebraic Geometry, MSRI Publications 28, Cambridge University Press, 1995, 57–64.
- Variétés de Fano (PDF). Séminaire Bourbaki No. 827, 1996/97.
