= Friedrich Schottky =

German mathematician

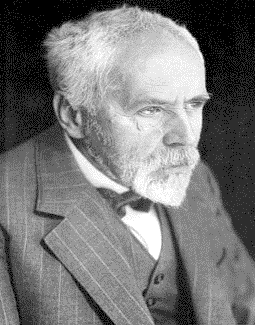
- Born: Friedrich Hermann Schottky; 24 July 1851; Breslau, Silesia Province, Kingdom of Prussia
- Died: 12 August 1935 (aged 84); Berlin, Free State of Prussia, Nazi Germany
- Education: University of Breslau (1870–1874); Frederick William University of Berlin (–1875, Doctoral dissertation)
- Occupation: Professor of mathematics (1882-1922)
- Known for: Schottky form Schottky–Klein prime form Schottky group Schottky problem Schottky theorem
- Scientific career
- Fields: Mathematics
- Institutions: University of Breslau (1878–1882); Eidgenössische Technische Hochschule Zürich (1882–1892); Philipps-Universität Marburg (1892–1902); Frederick William University of Berlin (1902–1922)
- Academic advisors: Karl Weierstrass; Hermann von Helmholtz
- Notable students: Heinrich Jung; Ernst Cassirer; Paul Koebe; Konrad Knopp; Walter Schnee; Leon Lichtenstein; Herman Müntz; Robert Jentzsch; Paul Bernays

Friedrich Hermann Schottky (24 July 1851 – 12 August 1935) was a German mathematician who worked on elliptic, abelian, and theta functions and introduced Schottky groups and Schottky's theorem.

== Biography ==
Friedrich Hermann Schottky was born in Breslau, Germany (now Wrocław, Poland). His father, Dr. Hermann Friedrich Schottky, was an English teacher and his mother, Louise Winkler, was a florist. He attended Maria-Magdalenen-Gymnasium from 1860 to 1870, where his classmates included Max Grube, Heinrich Rosin, and Eberhard Gothein. From 1870 to 1874 he attended the University of Breslau.

In 1875 Schottky received his doctorate, studying under Karl Weierstrass and Hermann von Helmholtz at Friedrich Wilhelm University of Berlin.

Schottky was a lecturer at the University of Breslau from 1878 to 1882, a professor at the University of Zurich from 1882 to 1892, and a professor at Philipps University of Marburg from 1892 to 1902. In 1902, through his friendship with Ferdinand Georg Frobenius, Schottky was able to obtain a professorship at Friedrich Wilhelm University of Berlin where he would remain until his retirement in 1922.

Schottky was elected to the Berlin Academy of Sciences in 1903.

Schottky died in Berlin in 1935.

Schottky married Henriette Schottky (née Hammer, 1858–1947) and had 5 children, including the physicist Walter H. Schottky and the botanist Ernst Max Schottky.

== Mathematics ==
Schottky's thesis on conformal mapping was well regarded by Weierstrass. Published in journal form in 1877, it introduced automorphic functions and Schottky groups, to be developed several years later by Henri Poincaré and Felix Klein.

Schottky's 1887 paper contributed to the theory of Poincaré series.

In algebraic geometry, the problem of characterizing when the abelian varieties of an algebraic curve are Jacobian varieties is called the Schottky problem. Initially posed by Bernhard Riemann, Schottky obtained the first results, for the case of genus 4, and made subsequent progress with his student Heinrich Jung. The problem was formally solved in 1986 by Takahiro Shiota but remains an area of active research.

In complex analysis, Schottky's theorem shows the existence of a bound on the value a holomorphic function can take on the unit disk.

== Publications ==
Schottky authored 55 papers and one book.

=== Papers ===
- Schottky, Friedrich (1877), "Ueber die conforme Abbildung mehrfach zusammenhängender ebener Flächen", Journal für die reine und angewandte Mathematik, 83: 300–351
- Schottky, Friedrich (1887), "Ueber eine specielle Function, welche bei einer bestimmten linearen Transformation ihres Arguments unverändert bleibt", Journal für die reine und angewandte Mathematik, 101: 227–272
- Schottky, Friedrich (1888). "Zur Theorie der Abelschen Funktionen von vier Variablen". Journal für die reine und angewandte Mathematik. 102: 304–352.
- Schottky, Friedrich (1904). "Über den Picardschen Satz und die Borelschen Ungleichungen". S.-B. Preuss. Akad. Wiss. Berlin, Phys. Math.: 1244–1263.
- Schottky, Friedrich; Jung, Heinrich (1909). "Neue Sätze über Symmetralfunktionen und die Abel'schen Funktionen der Riemann'schen Theorie". S.-B. Preuss. Akad. Wiss. Berlin, Phys. Math.: 282–287, 737–750.

=== Book ===
- Friedrich Schottky (1880). Abriss einer Theorie der Abelschen Functionen von drei Variabeln (PDF).

== See also ==
- Prime form
- Prym variety
- Timeline of abelian varieties
