= Beauville–Laszlo theorem =

Lets one glue 2 sheaves over an infinitesimal neighborhood of an algebraic curve point

In mathematics, the Beauville–Laszlo theorem is a result in commutative algebra and algebraic geometry that allows one to "glue" two sheaves over an infinitesimal neighborhood of a point on an algebraic curve. It was proved by Arnaud Beauville and Yves Laszlo (1995).

== The theorem ==
Although it has implications in algebraic geometry, the theorem is a local result and is stated in its most primitive form for commutative rings. If A is a ring and f is a nonzero element of A, then we can form two derived rings: the localization at f, A_{f}, and the completion at Af, Â; both are A-algebras. In the following we assume that f is a non-zero divisor. Geometrically, A is viewed as a scheme X = Spec A and f as a divisor (f) on Spec A; then A_{f} is its complement D_{f} = Spec A_{f}, the principal open set determined by f, while Â is an "infinitesimal neighborhood" D = Spec Â of (f). The intersection of D_{f} and Spec Â is a "punctured infinitesimal neighborhood" D^{0} about (f), equal to Spec Â ⊗_{A} A_{f} = Spec Â_{f}.

Suppose now that we have an A-module M; geometrically, M is a sheaf on Spec A, and we can restrict it to both the principal open set D_{f} and the infinitesimal neighborhood Spec Â, yielding an A_{f}-module F and an Â-module G. Algebraically,

$$F = M \otimes_A A_f = M_f \qquad G = M \otimes_A \hat{A}.$$

(Despite the notational temptation to write $G = \widehat{M}$, meaning the completion of the A-module M at the ideal Af, unless A is noetherian and M is finitely-generated, the two are not in fact equal.) F and G can both be further restricted to the punctured neighborhood D^{0}, and since both restrictions are ultimately derived from M, they are isomorphic: we have an isomorphism

$$\phi \colon G_f \xrightarrow{\sim} F \otimes_{A_f} \hat{A}_f = F \otimes_A \hat{A}.$$

Now consider the converse situation: we have a ring A and an element f, and two modules: an A_{f}-module F and an Â-module G, together with an isomorphism φ as above. Geometrically, we are given a scheme X and both an open set D_{f} and a "small" neighborhood D of its closed complement (f); on D_{f} and D we are given two sheaves which agree on the intersection D^{0} = D_{f} ∩ D. If D were an open set in the Zariski topology we could glue the sheaves; the content of the Beauville–Laszlo theorem is that, under one technical assumption on f, the same is true for the infinitesimal neighborhood D as well.

Theorem: Given A, f, F, G, and φ as above, if G has no f-torsion, then there exist an A-module M and isomorphisms

$$\alpha \colon M_f \xrightarrow{\sim} F \qquad \beta \colon M \otimes_A \hat{A} \xrightarrow{\sim} G$$

consistent with the isomorphism φ: φ is equal to the composition

$$G_f = G \otimes_A A_f \xrightarrow{\beta^{-1} \otimes 1} M \otimes_A \hat{A} \otimes_A A_f = M_f \otimes_A \hat{A} \xrightarrow{\alpha \otimes 1} F \otimes_A \hat{A}.$$

The technical condition that G has no f-torsion is referred to by the authors as "f-regularity". In fact, one can state a stronger version of this theorem. Let M(A) be the category of A-modules (whose morphisms are A-module homomorphisms) and let M_{f}(A) be the full subcategory of f-regular modules. In this notation, we obtain a commutative diagram of categories (note M_{f}(A_{f}) = M(A_{f})):

$$\begin{array}{ccc}
\mathbf{M}_f(A) & \longrightarrow & \mathbf{M}_f(\hat{A}) \\
\downarrow & & \downarrow \\
\mathbf{M}(A_f) & \longrightarrow & \mathbf{M}(\hat{A}_f)
\end{array}$$

in which the arrows are the base-change maps; for example, the top horizontal arrow acts on objects by M → M ⊗_{A} Â.

Theorem: The above diagram is a cartesian diagram of categories.

== Global version ==
In geometric language, the Beauville–Laszlo theorem allows one to glue sheaves on a one-dimensional affine scheme over an infinitesimal neighborhood of a point. Since sheaves have a "local character" and since any scheme is locally affine, the theorem admits a global statement of the same nature. The version of this statement that the authors found noteworthy concerns vector bundles:

Theorem: Let X be an algebraic curve over a field k, x a k-rational smooth point on X with infinitesimal neighborhood D = Spec k[[t]], R a k-algebra, and r a positive integer. Then the category Vect_{r}(X_{R}) of rank-r vector bundles on the curve X_{R} = X ×_{Spec k} Spec R fits into a cartesian diagram:

$$\begin{array}{ccc}
\mathbf{Vect}_r(X_R) & \longrightarrow & \mathbf{Vect}_r(D_R) \\
\downarrow & & \downarrow \\
\mathbf{Vect}_r((X \setminus x)_R) & \longrightarrow & \mathbf{Vect}_r(D_R^0)
\end{array}$$

This entails a corollary stated in the paper:

Corollary: With the same setup, denote by Triv(X_{R}) the set of triples (E, τ, σ), where E is a vector bundle on X_{R}, τ is a trivialization of E over (X \ x)_{R} (i.e., an isomorphism with the trivial bundle O_{(X - x)_{R}}), and σ a trivialization over D_{R}. Then the maps in the above diagram furnish a bijection between Triv(X_{R}) and GL_{r}(R((t))) (where R((t)) is the formal Laurent series ring).

The corollary follows from the theorem in that the triple is associated with the unique matrix which, viewed as a "transition function" over D^{0}_{R} between the trivial bundles over (X \ x)_{R} and over D_{R}, allows gluing them to form E, with the natural trivializations of the glued bundle then being identified with σ and τ. The importance of this corollary is that it shows that the affine Grassmannian may be formed either from the data of bundles over an infinitesimal disk, or bundles on an entire algebraic curve.
