= John Fay =

John Fay may refer to:

- John Fay (American football) (1895–1983), American football player
- John D. Fay (1815–1895), American civil engineer
- John Fay (politician) (1773–1855), American politician
- John J. Fay Jr. (1927–2003), American politician in New Jersey
- John Fay (writer) (21st century), British television writer
- John David Fay, mathematician, eponym of Fay's trisecant identity

== See also ==
- Johnny Fay, drummer for the band The Tragically Hip
