= Freeman Dyson =

British theoretical physicist and mathematician (1923–2020)

Freeman Dyson FRS
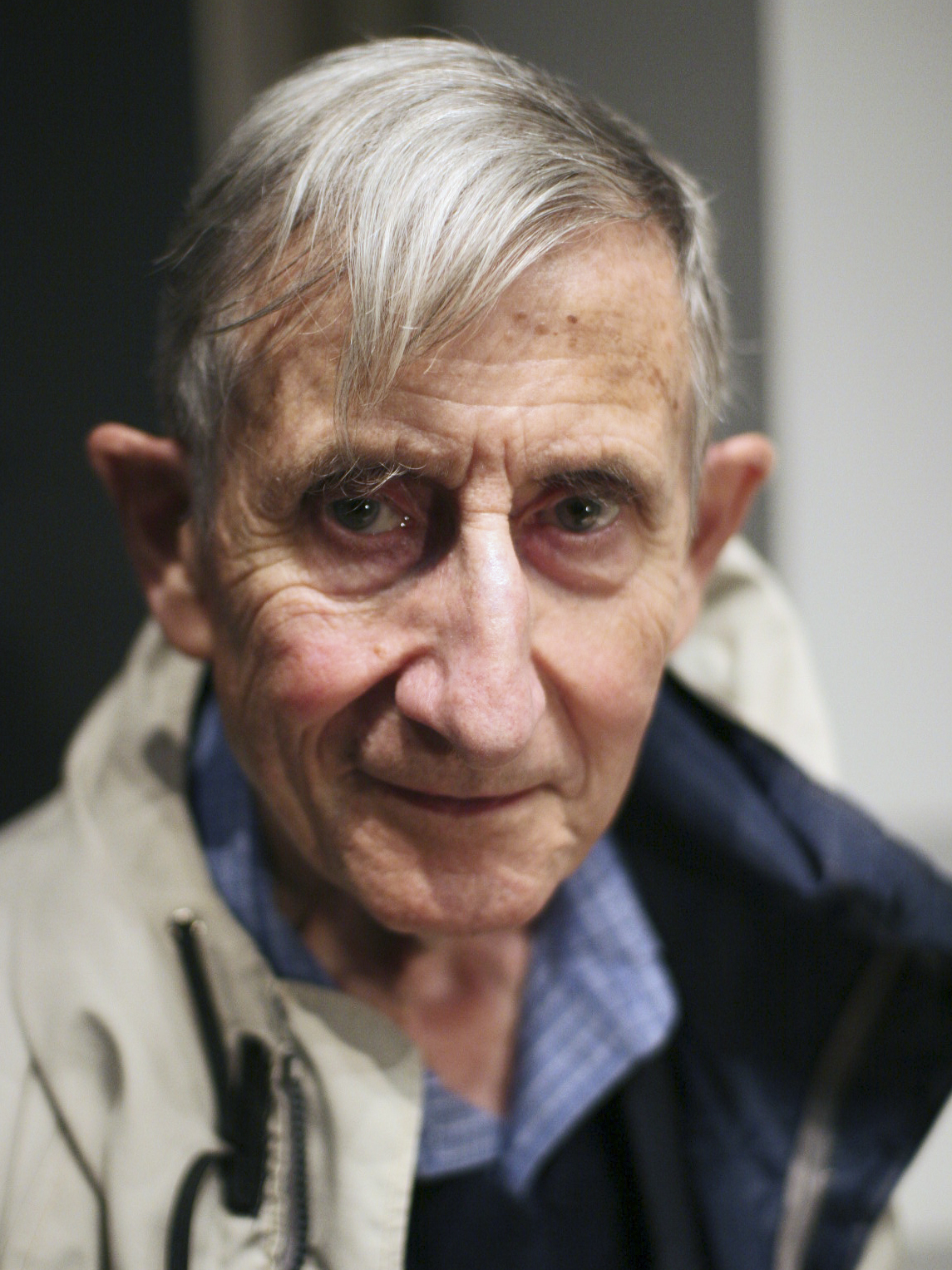
- Dyson at the Long Now Seminar in San Francisco, California, in 2005
- Born: Freeman John Dyson; 15 December 1923; Crowthorne, Berkshire, England
- Died: 28 February 2020 (aged 96); Plainsboro Township, New Jersey, U.S.
- Citizenship: United Kingdom; United States (from 1957)
- Education: Trinity College, Cambridge; Cornell University
- Known for: Circular ensemble; Crank conjecture; Crank of a partition; Rank of a partition; Random matrix theory; Stability of matter; Self-replicating machine; Quantum electrodynamics; Helios propulsion system; Project Orion; TRIGA; Advocacy against nuclear weapons; Dyson sphere
- Spouses: Verena Huber (m. 1950; div. 1958); Imme Jung (m. 1958)
- Children: 6, including Esther Dyson and George Dyson
- Parent: George Dyson
- Awards: Heineman Prize (1965); Lorentz Medal (1966); Hughes Medal (1968); Max Planck Medal (1969); Harvey Prize (1977); Wolf Prize (1981); Andrew Gemant Award (1988); Matteucci Medal (1989); Oersted Medal (1991); Enrico Fermi Award (1993); Templeton Prize (2000); Pomeranchuk Prize (2003); Henri Poincaré Prize (2012)
- Scientific career
- Fields: Physics, mathematics
- Workplaces: Royal Air Force; Institute for Advanced Study; University of Birmingham; Cornell University
- Academic advisors: Hans Bethe
- Website: ias.edu/sns/dyson

Freeman John Dyson (15 December 1923 – 28 February 2020) was a British-American theoretical physicist and mathematician who worked in quantum field theory, astrophysics, random matrices, mathematical formulation of quantum mechanics, condensed matter physics, nuclear physics, and engineering. He was professor emeritus in the Institute for Advanced Study in Princeton and a member of the board of sponsors of the Bulletin of the Atomic Scientists.

Dyson originated several concepts that bear his name, such as Dyson's transform, a fundamental technique in additive number theory, which he developed as part of his proof of Mann's theorem; the Dyson tree, a hypothetical genetically engineered plant capable of growing in a comet; the Dyson series, a perturbative series where each term is represented by Feynman diagrams; the Dyson sphere, a thought experiment that attempts to explain how a space-faring civilization would meet its energy requirements with a hypothetical megastructure that completely encompasses a star and captures a large percentage of its power output; and Dyson's eternal intelligence, a means by which an immortal society of intelligent beings in an open universe could escape the prospect of the heat death of the universe by extending subjective time to infinity while expending only a finite amount of energy. Drawing on Niels Bohr's principle of complementarity, he argued that science and spirituality were compatible. Dyson was a regular contributor to The New York Review of Books and published a memoir, Disturbing the Universe (1979). This was bookended by Maker of Patterns: An Autobiography Through Letters (2018).

He disagreed with the scientific consensus on climate change. He believed that some of the effects of increased CO_{2} levels are favourable and not taken into account by climate scientists, such as increased agricultural yield, and further that the positive benefits of CO_{2} likely outweigh the negative effects. He was skeptical about the simulation models used to predict climate change, arguing that political efforts to reduce causes of climate change distract from other global problems that should take priority. He was awarded the 1996 Lewis Thomas Prize and the 2000 Templeton Prize. He wrote, "As we look out into the Universe and identify the many accidents of physics and astronomy that have worked together to our benefit, it almost seems as if the Universe must in some sense have known that we were coming."

== Biography ==
=== Early life ===
Dyson was born on 15 December 1923, in Crowthorne in Berkshire, England. He was the son of the composer George Dyson. His mother Mildred (née Atkey) had a law degree, and after Dyson was born she worked as a social worker. She "passed on to Freedman her deep love of literature, beginning with Chaucer and the poets of ancient Greece and Rome." Dyson had one sibling, his older sister, Alice, who remembered him as a boy surrounded by encyclopaedias and always calculating on sheets of paper. At the age of four he tried to calculate the number of atoms in the Sun. As a child, he showed an interest in large numbers and in the Solar System, and was deeply influenced by Eric Temple Bell's Men of Mathematics (1937). His favorite childhood book was E. Nesbit's The Magic City. He wrote, "What I see now, and did not see as an eight-year-old, is that Nesbit’s crazy universe bears a strong resemblance to the one we live in.” Politically, Dyson said he was "brought up as a socialist". He wrote that "One of my grandmothers was a notorious and successful faith healer. One of my cousins was for many years the editor of the Journal of the Society for Psychical Research. Both of these ladies were well educated, highly intelligent, and fervent believers in paranormal phenomenon. They may have been deluded, but neither of them was a fool."

From 1936 to 1941 Dyson was a scholar at Winchester College, where his father was Director of Music. He was fascinated by Bach's The Well-Tempered Clavier, particularly the Prelude in E-flat minor. At the age of 17 he studied pure mathematics with Abram Besicovitch as his tutor at Trinity College, Cambridge, where he won a scholarship at age 15. During this stay, Dyson also practised night climbing on the university buildings, and once walked from Cambridge to London in a day with his friend Oscar Hahn, nephew of Kurt Hahn, who was a wheelchair user due to polio.

At the age of 19 he was assigned to war work in the Operational Research Section (ORS) of RAF Bomber Command, where he developed analytical methods for calculating the ideal density for bomber formations to help the Royal Air Force bomb German targets during the Second World War. After the war, Dyson was readmitted to Trinity College, where he obtained a BA degree in mathematics. From 1946 to 1949 he was a fellow of his college, occupying rooms just below those of the philosopher Ludwig Wittgenstein, who resigned his professorship in 1947.

In 1947 Dyson published two papers in number theory. Friends and colleagues described him as shy and self-effacing, with a contrarian streak that his friends found refreshing but intellectual opponents found exasperating. "I have the sense that when consensus is forming like ice hardening on a lake, Dyson will do his best to chip at the ice", Steven Weinberg said of him. His friend the neurologist and author Oliver Sacks said: "A favourite word of Freeman's about doing science and being creative is the word 'subversive'. He feels it's rather important not only to be not orthodox, but to be subversive, and he's done that all his life."

=== Career in the United States ===
On G. I. Taylor's advice and recommendation, Dyson moved to the United States in 1947 as a Commonwealth Fellow for postgraduate study with Hans Bethe at Cornell University (1947–1948). There he made the acquaintance of Richard Feynman. Dyson recognized the brilliance of Feynman and worked with him. He then moved to the Institute for Advanced Study (1948–1949), before returning to England (1949–51), where he was a research fellow at the University of Birmingham. In 1949, Dyson demonstrated the equivalence of two formulations of quantum electrodynamics (QED): Richard Feynman's diagrams and the operator method developed by Julian Schwinger and Shin'ichirō Tomonaga. He was the first person after their creator to appreciate the power of Feynman diagrams and his paper written in 1948 and published in 1949 was the first to make use of them. He said in that paper that Feynman diagrams were not just a computational tool but a physical theory and developed rules for the diagrams that completely solved the renormalization problem. He recalls riding in a Greyound bus in Nebraska when:

something suddenly happened. For two weeks I had not thought about physics, and now it came bursting into my consciousness like an explosion. Feynman’s pictures and Schwinger’s equations began sorting themselves out in my head with a clarity I had never seen before. For the first time I was able to put them together. For an hour or two I arranged and rearranged the pieces. Then I knew that they all fitted. I had no pencil or paper, but everything was so clear I did not need to write it down. Feynman and Schwinger were just looking at the same set of ideas from two different sides. Putting their methods together, you would have a theory of quantum electrodynamics that combined the mathematical precision of Schwinger with the practical flexibility of Feynman. … In the hour of illumination I gave thanks to my teacher Hans Bethe, who had made it possible.

Dyson's paper and his lectures presented Feynman's theories of QED in a form that other physicists could understand, facilitating the physics community's acceptance of Feynman's work. J. Robert Oppenheimer, in particular, was persuaded by Dyson that Feynman's new theory was as valid as Schwinger's and Tomonaga's. Also in 1949, in related work, Dyson invented the Dyson series. It was this paper that inspired John Ward to derive his celebrated Ward–Takahashi identity.

Dyson joined the faculty at Cornell as a physics professor in 1951, though he still had no doctorate. In December 1952, Oppenheimer, the director of the Institute for Advanced Study in Princeton, New Jersey, offered Dyson a lifetime appointment at the institute, "for proving me wrong", in Oppenheimer's words. Dyson remained at the Institute until the end of his career. In 1957 he became a US citizen. He recalled "The decision to abjure my allegiance to Queen Elizabeth might have been a difficult one, but the Queen's ministers made it easy for me." From 1957 to 1961 Dyson worked on Project Orion, which proposed the possibility of space-flight using nuclear pulse propulsion. A prototype was demonstrated using conventional explosives, but the 1963 Partial Test Ban Treaty, in which Dyson was involved and which he supported, permitted only underground nuclear weapons testing, and the project was abandoned in 1965.

In 1958 Dyson was a member of the design team under Edward Teller for TRIGA, a small, inherently safe nuclear reactor used throughout the world in hospitals and universities for the production of medical isotopes.

In 1966, independently of Elliott H. Lieb and Walter Thirring, Dyson and Andrew Lenard published a paper proving that the Pauli exclusion principle plays the main role in the stability of matter. Hence it is not the electromagnetic repulsion between outer-shell orbital electrons that prevents two stacked wood blocks from coalescing into a single piece, but the exclusion principle applied to electrons and protons that generates the classical macroscopic normal force. In condensed matter physics, Dyson also analysed the phase transition of the Ising model in one dimension and spin waves.

Dyson also did work in a variety of topics in mathematics, such as topology, analysis, number theory and random matrices. In 1973 the number theorist Hugh Lowell Montgomery was visiting the Institute for Advanced Study and had just made his pair correlation conjecture concerning the distribution of the zeros of the Riemann zeta function. He showed his formula to the mathematician Atle Selberg, who said that it looked like something in mathematical physics and that Montgomery should show it to Dyson, which he did. Dyson recognized the formula as the pair correlation function of the Gaussian unitary ensemble, which physicists have studied extensively. This suggested that there might be an unexpected connection between the distribution of primes (2, 3, 5, 7, 11, ...) and the energy levels in the nuclei of heavy elements such as uranium.

Around 1979 Dyson worked with the Institute for Energy Analysis on climate studies. This group, under Alvin Weinberg's direction, pioneered multidisciplinary climate studies, including a strong biology group. Also during the 1970s, Dyson worked on climate studies conducted by the JASON defense advisory group.

Dyson retired from the Institute for Advanced Study in 1994. In 1998 he joined the board of the Solar Electric Light Fund. In 2003 he was president of the Space Studies Institute, the space research organization founded by Gerard K. O'Neill; in 2013 he was on its board of trustees. Dyson was a longtime member of the JASON group.

Dyson won numerous scientific awards, but never a Nobel Prize. Nobel laureate Steven Weinberg said that the Nobel committee "fleeced" Dyson, but Dyson remarked in 2009, "I think it's almost true without exception if you want to win a Nobel Prize, you should have a long attention span, get hold of some deep and important problem and stay with it for ten years. That wasn't my style."

In 2012 Dyson published (with William H. Press) a fundamental new result about the prisoner's dilemma in the Proceedings of the National Academy of Sciences of the United States of America.

=== Personal life and death ===
Dyson married his first wife, the Swiss mathematician Verena Huber, on 11 August 1950. They had two children, Esther and George, before divorcing in 1958. In November 1958 he married Imme Jung, with whom he had four daughters.

Dyson died at Penn Medicine Princeton Medical Center in Plainsboro Township, New Jersey, on 28 February 2020, from complications following a fall. He was 96.

== Concepts ==
=== Biotechnology and genetic engineering ===
Dyson admitted his record as a prophet was mixed, but thought it is better to be wrong than vague, and that in meeting the world's material needs, technology must be beautiful and cheap.

My book The Sun, the Genome, and the Internet (1999) describes a vision of green technology enriching villages all over the world and halting the migration from villages to megacities. The three components of the vision are all essential: the sun to provide energy where it is needed, the genome to provide plants that can convert sunlight into chemical fuels cheaply and efficiently, the Internet to end the intellectual and economic isolation of rural populations. With all three components in place, every village in Africa could enjoy its fair share of the blessings of civilization.

— Dyson 2007

Dyson coined the term "green technologies", based on biology instead of physics or chemistry, to describe new species of microorganisms and plants designed to meet human needs. He argued that such technologies would be based on solar power rather than the fossil fuels whose use he saw as part of what he calls "gray technologies" of industry. He believed that genetically engineered crops, which he described as green, can help end rural poverty, with a movement based in ethics to end the inequitable distribution of wealth on the planet.

=== The Origin of Life ===
Dyson favoured the dual origin theory: that life first formed as cells, then enzymes, and finally, much later, genes. This was first propounded by the Russian biochemist, Alexander Oparin. J. B. S. Haldane developed the same theory independently. In Dyson's version of the theory, life evolved in two stages, widely separated in time. Because of the biochemistry, he regards it as too unlikely that genes could have developed fully blown in one process. Current cells contain adenosine triphosphate or ATP and adenosine 5'-monophosphate or AMP, which greatly resemble each other but have completely different functions. ATP transports energy around the cell, and AMP is part of RNA and the genetic apparatus. Dyson proposed that in a primitive early cell containing ATP and AMP, RNA and replication came into existence only because of the similarity between AMP and RNA. He suggested that AMP was produced when ATP molecules lost two of their phosphate radicals, and then one cell somewhere performed Eigen's experiment and produced RNA.

There is no direct evidence for the dual origin theory, because once genes developed, they took over, obliterating all traces of the earlier forms of life. In the first origin, the cells were probably just drops of water held together by surface tension, teeming with enzymes and chemical reactions, and having a primitive kind of growth or replication. When the liquid drop became too big, it split into two drops. Many complex molecules formed in these "little city economies" and the probability that genes would eventually develop in them was much greater than in the prebiotic environment.

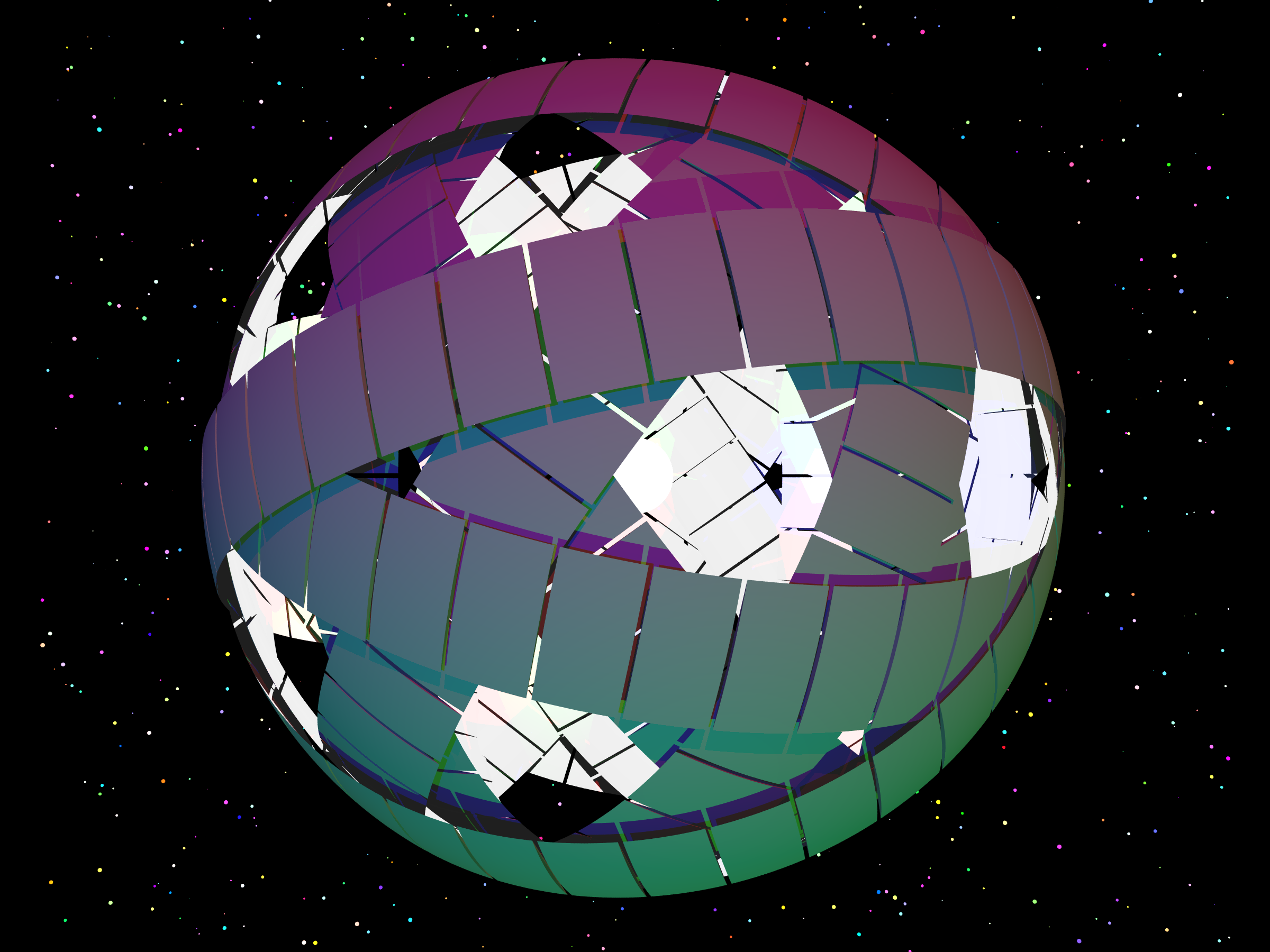
Artist's concept of Dyson rings, forming a stable Dyson swarm, or "Dyson sphere"

=== Dyson sphere ===
In 1960 Dyson wrote a short paper for the journal Science titled "Search for Artificial Stellar Sources of Infrared Radiation". In it he speculated that a technologically advanced extraterrestrial civilization might surround its native star with artificial structures to maximize the capture of the star's energy. Eventually, the civilization would enclose the star, intercepting electromagnetic radiation with wavelengths from visible light downward and radiating waste heat outward as infrared radiation. One method of searching for extraterrestrial civilizations would be to look for large objects radiating in the infrared range of the electromagnetic spectrum.

One should expect that, within a few thousand years of its entering the stage of industrial development, any intelligent species should be found occupying an artificial biosphere which surrounds its parent star.

— Davis 1978

Dyson conceived that such structures would be clouds of asteroid-sized space habitats, though science fiction writers have preferred a solid structure: either way, such an artifact is often called a Dyson sphere, although Dyson used the term "shell". Dyson said that he used the term "artificial biosphere" in the article to mean a habitat, not a shape. The general concept of such an energy-transferring shell had been created decades earlier by Olaf Stapledon in his 1937 novel Star Maker, a source which Dyson credited: "Some science fiction writers have wrongly given me the credit of inventing the artificial biosphere. In fact, I took the idea from Olaf Stapledon, one of their own colleagues."{

Freeman Dyson was interviewed by Robert Wright in 2003 and the Dyson Sphere topic was broached. In response he stated that the paper he wrote on this concept was intended to be a joke and had nothing to do with work. He added that it amused him that he had become famous only for the things he didn't think were serious.

=== Dyson tree ===
Dyson also proposed the creation of a Dyson tree, a genetically engineered plant capable of growing inside a comet. He suggested that comets could be engineered to contain hollow spaces filled with a breathable atmosphere, thus providing self-sustaining habitats for humanity in the outer Solar System.

Plants could grow greenhouses... just as turtles grow shells and polar bears grow fur and polyps build coral reefs in tropical seas. These plants could keep warm by the light from a distant Sun and conserve the oxygen that they produce by photosynthesis. The greenhouse would consist of a thick skin providing thermal insulation, with small transparent windows to admit sunlight. Outside the skin would be an array of simple lenses, focusing sunlight through the windows into the interior... Groups of greenhouses could grow together to form extended habitats for other species of plants and animals.

— Dyson 1997

=== Space colonies ===
I've done some historical research on the costs of the Mayflower's voyage, and on the Mormons' emigration to Utah, and I think it's possible to go into space on a much smaller scale. A cost on the order of $40,000 per person [1978 dollars, $181,600 in 2022 dollars] would be the target to shoot for; in terms of real wages, that would make it comparable to the colonization of America. Unless it's brought down to that level it's not really interesting to me, because otherwise, it would be a luxury that only governments could afford.

— Davis 1978

Dyson was interested in space travel since he was a child, reading such science fiction classics as Olaf Stapledon's Star Maker. As a young man, he worked for General Atomics on the nuclear-powered Orion spacecraft. He hoped Project Orion would put men on Mars by 1965, and Saturn by 1970. For a quarter-century, Dyson was unhappy about how the government conducted space travel:

The problem is, of course, that they can't afford to fail. The rules of the game are that you don't take a chance, because if you fail, then probably your whole program gets wiped out.

— Davis 1978

Dyson still hoped for cheap space travel, but was resigned to waiting for private entrepreneurs to develop something new and inexpensive.

No law of physics or biology forbids cheap travel and settlement all over the solar system and beyond. But it is impossible to predict how long this will take. Predictions of the dates of future achievements are notoriously fallible. My guess is that the era of cheap unmanned missions will be the next fifty years, and the era of cheap manned missions will start sometime late in the twenty-first century. Any affordable program of manned exploration must be centred in biology, and its time frame tied to the time frame of biotechnology; a hundred years, roughly the time it will take us to learn to grow warm-blooded plants, is probably reasonable.

— Dyson 1997

=== Space exploration ===
A direct search for life in Europa's ocean would today be prohibitively expensive. Impacts on Europa give us an easier way to look for evidence of life there. Every time a major impact occurs on Europa, a vast quantity of water is splashed from the ocean into the space around Jupiter. Some of the water evaporates, and some condenses into snow. Creatures living in the water far enough from the impact have a chance of being splashed intact into space and quickly freeze-dried. Therefore, an easy way to look for evidence of life in Europa's ocean is to look for freeze-dried fish in the ring of space debris orbiting Jupiter. Freeze-dried fish orbiting Jupiter is a fanciful notion, but nature in the biological realm has a tendency to be fanciful. Nature is usually more imaginative than we are. ...To have the best chance of success, we should keep our eyes open for all possibilities.

— Dyson 1997

=== Dyson's eternal intelligence ===
Dyson proposed that an immortal group of intelligent beings could escape the prospect of heat death by extending time to infinity while expending only a finite amount of energy. This is also known as the Dyson scenario.

=== Dyson's transform ===
His concept "Dyson's transform" led to one of the most important lemmas of Olivier Ramaré's theorem: that every even integer can be written as a sum of no more than six primes.

=== Dyson series ===
The Dyson series, the formal solution of an explicitly time-dependent Schrödinger equation by iteration, and the corresponding Dyson time-ordering operator $\mathcal T\,,$ an entity of basic importance in the mathematical formulation of quantum mechanics, are also named after Dyson.

=== Quantum physics and prime numbers ===
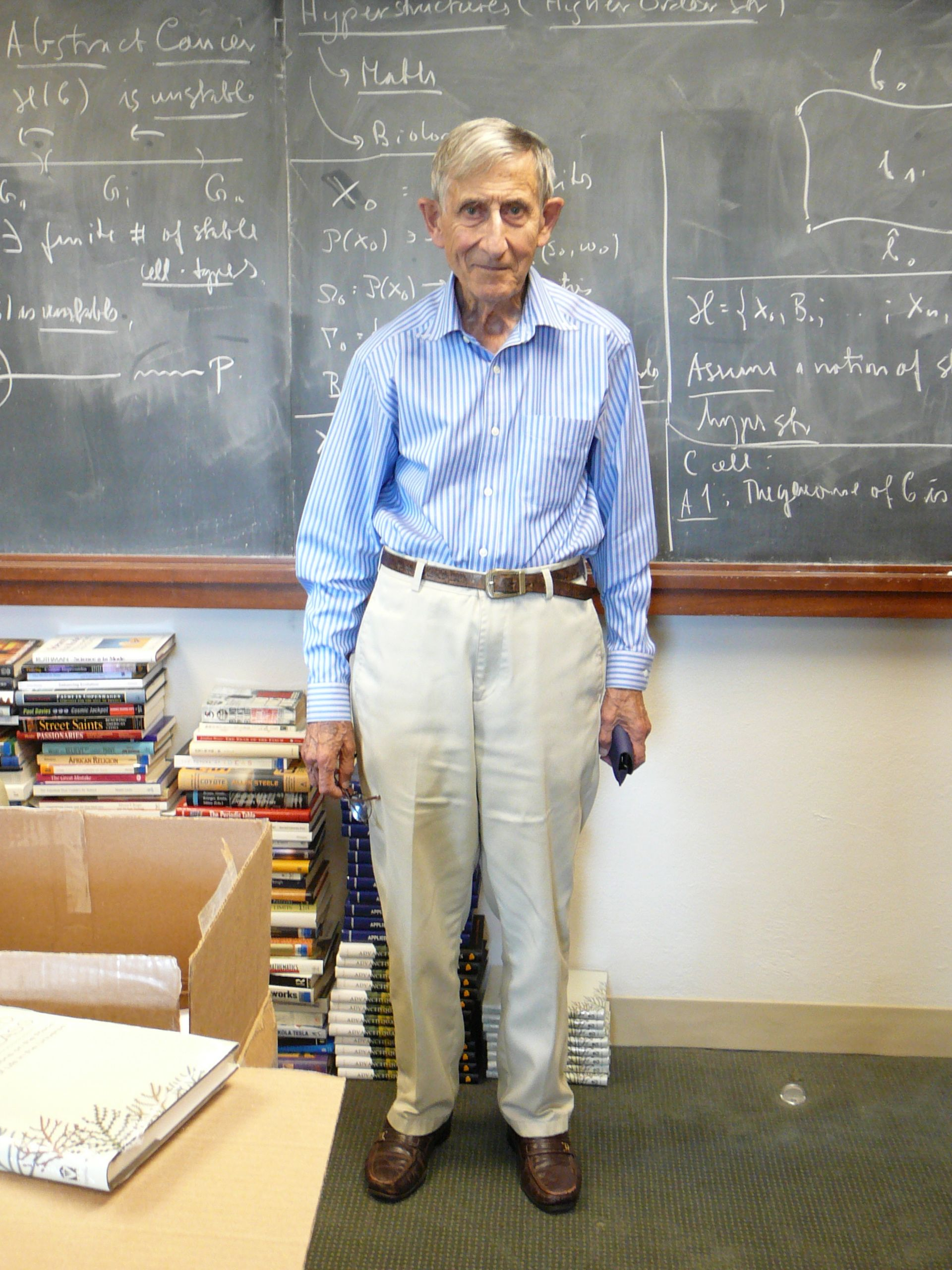
Freeman Dyson in 2007 at the Institute for Advanced Study

Dyson and Hugh Montgomery discovered an intriguing connection between quantum physics and Montgomery's pair correlation conjecture about the zeros of the zeta function. The primes 2, 3, 5, 7, 11, 13, 17, 19,... are described by the Riemann zeta function, and Dyson had previously developed a description of quantum physics based on m by m arrays of totally random numbers. Montgomery and Dyson discovered that the eigenvalues of these matrices are spaced apart in exactly the same manner as Montgomery conjectured for the nontrivial zeros of the zeta function. Andrew Odlyzko has verified the conjecture on a computer, using his Odlyzko–Schönhage algorithm to calculate many zeros.

There are in nature one, two, and three-dimensional quasicrystals. Mathematicians define a quasicrystal as a set of discrete points whose Fourier transform is also a set of discrete points. Odlyzko has done extensive computations of the Fourier transform of the nontrivial zeros of the zeta function, and they seem to form a one-dimensional quasicrystal. This would in fact follow from the Riemann hypothesis.

=== Rank of a partition ===
The rank of a partition, shown as its Young diagram

In number theory and combinatorics, the rank of an integer partition is a certain integer associated with the partition. Dyson introduced the concept in a paper published in the journal Eureka. It was presented in the context of a study of certain congruence properties of the partition function discovered by the mathematician Srinivasa Ramanujan.

=== Crank of a partition ===
In number theory, the crank of a partition is a certain integer associated with the partition. Dyson first introduced the term without a definition in a 1944 paper in a journal published by the Mathematics Society of Cambridge University. He then gave a list of properties this yet-to-be-defined quantity should have. In 1988, George E. Andrews and Frank Garvan discovered a definition for the crank satisfying the properties Dyson had hypothesized.

=== Astrochicken ===
Astrochicken is the name given to a thought experiment Dyson expounded in his book Disturbing the Universe (1979). He contemplated how humanity could build a small, self-replicating automaton that could explore space more efficiently than a crewed craft could. He attributed the general idea to John von Neumann, based on a lecture von Neumann gave in 1948 titled The General and Logical Theory of Automata. Dyson expanded on von Neumann's automata theories and added a biological component.

=== Lumpers and splitters ===
Dyson suggested that philosophers can be broadly if simplistically, divided into lumpers and splitters. These roughly correspond to Platonists, who regard the world as made up of ideas, and materialists, who imagine it divided into atoms.

== Views ==
=== Psychic phenomena ===
Reviewing Georges Charpak and Henri Broch's Debunked! ESP, Telekenesis and Other Pseudoscience, he wrote "Charpak and Broch have done a fine job sweeping out the moneypchangers from the temple of science and exposing their tricks." He went on: "The hypothesis that paranormal phenomena are real but lie outside the limits of science is supported by a great mass of evidence. ... I find it plausible that a world of mental phenomena should exist, too fluid and evanescent to be grasped by the cumbersome tools of science. ... I am suggesting that paranormal mental abilities and scientific method may be complementary. The word 'complementarity' is a technical term introduced into physics by Niels Bohr. It means that two descriptions of nature may both be valid but cannot be observed simultaneously. The classic example of complemntarity is the dual nature of light. In one experiment light is seen to behave as a continuous wave, in another experiment it behaves as a swarm of particles, but we cannot see the wave and the particles in the same experiment. Complementarity in physics is an established fact. The extension of the idea of complementarity to mental phenomena is pure speculation. But I find it plausible." He wrote a foreword to Elizabeth Lloyd Mayer's Extraordinary Knowing, arguing "ESP is real... but cannot be tested with the clumsy tools of science".

=== Climate change ===
Dyson agreed that technically humans and additional CO_{2} emissions contribute to warming. However, he felt that the benefits of additional CO_{2} outweighed any associated negative effects. He said that in many ways increased atmospheric carbon dioxide is beneficial, and that it is increasing biological growth, agricultural yields and forests. He believed that existing simulation models of climate change fail to account for some important factors, and that the results thus contain too great a margin of error to reliably predict trends. He argued that political efforts to reduce the causes of climate change distract from other global problems that should take priority, and viewed the acceptance of climate change as comparable to religion.

In 2009, Dyson criticised James Hansen's climate-change activism. "The person who is really responsible for this overestimate of global warming is Jim Hansen. He consistently exaggerates all the dangers... Hansen has turned his science into ideology." Hansen responded that Dyson "doesn't know what he's talking about... If he's going to wander into something with major consequences for humanity and other life on the planet, then he should first do his homework- which he obviously has not done on global warming". Dyson replied that "[m]y objections to the global warming propaganda are not so much over the technical facts, about which I do not know much, but it's rather against the way those people behave and the kind of intolerance to criticism that a lot of them have." Dyson stated in an interview that the argument with Hansen was exaggerated by The New York Times, stating that he and Hansen are "friends, but we don't agree on everything."

Since originally taking an interest in climate studies in the 1970s, Dyson suggested that carbon dioxide levels in the atmosphere could be controlled by planting fast-growing trees. He calculated that it would take a trillion trees to remove all carbon from the atmosphere. In a 2014 interview he said, "What I'm convinced of is that we don't understand climate... It will take a lot of very hard work before that question is settled."

Dyson was a member of the academic advisory council of the Global Warming Policy Foundation.

=== Warfare and weapons ===
At RAF Bomber Command, Dyson and colleagues proposed removing two gun turrets from Avro Lancaster bombers, to cut the catastrophic losses due to German fighters in the Battle of Berlin. A Lancaster without turrets could fly 50 mph (80 km/h) faster and be much more manoeuvrable.

All our advice to the commander in chief [went] through the chief of our section, who was a career civil servant. His guiding principle was to tell the commander in chief things that the commander in chief liked to hear... To push the idea of ripping out gun turrets, against the official mythology of the gallant gunner defending his crew mates... was not the kind of suggestion the commander in chief liked to hear.

— Dyson 1979, "The Children's Crusade"

On hearing the news of the bombing of Hiroshima:

I agreed emphatically with Henry Stimson. Once we had got ourselves into the business of bombing cities, we might as well do the job competently and get it over with. I felt better that morning than I had felt for years... Those fellows who had built the atomic bombs obviously knew their stuff... Later, much later, I would remember [the downside].

— Dyson 1979, "The Blood of a Poet"

I am convinced that to avoid nuclear war it is not sufficient to be afraid of it. It is necessary to be afraid, but it is equally necessary to understand. And the first step in understanding is to recognize that the problem of nuclear war is basically not technical but human and historical. If we are to avoid destruction we must first of all understand the human and historical context out of which destruction arises.

— Dyson 1984

In 1967, in his capacity as a military adviser, Dyson wrote an influential paper on the issue of possible US use of tactical nuclear weapons in the Vietnam War. When a general said in a meeting, "I think it might be a good idea to throw in a nuke now and then, just to keep the other side guessing...">{ Dyson became alarmed and obtained permission to write a report on the pros and cons of using such weapons from a purely military point of view. (This report, Tactical Nuclear Weapons in Southeast Asia, published by the Institute for Defense Analyses, was obtained, with some redactions, by the Nautilus Institute for Security and Sustainability under the Freedom of Information act in 2002.) It was sufficiently objective that both sides of the debate based their arguments on it. Dyson says that the report showed that, even from a narrow military point of view, the US was better off not using nuclear weapons.

Dyson opposed the Vietnam War and the invasion of Iraq. He supported Barack Obama in the 2008 US presidential election and The New York Times described him as a political liberal. He was one of 29 leading US scientists who wrote Obama a strongly supportive letter about his administration's 2015 nuclear deal with Iran.

=== Science and religion ===
Dyson was raised in what he described as a "watered-down Church of England Christianity". He was a nondenominational Christian and attended various churches, from Presbyterian to Roman Catholic. Regarding doctrinal or Christological issues, he said, "I am neither a saint nor a theologian. To me, good works are more important than theology." In The God Delusion (2006), evolutionary biologist and atheist activist Richard Dawkins singled out Dyson for accepting the Templeton Prize in 2000: "It would be taken as an endorsement of religion by one of the world's most distinguished physicists." In 2000, Dyson declared that he was a (non-denominational) Christian, and he disagreed with Dawkins on several subjects, such as that group selection is less important than individual selection in evolution.

Dyson partially disagreed with the remark by his fellow physicist Steven Weinberg that "With or without religion, good people can behave well and bad people can do evil; but for good people to do evil – that takes religion."

Weinberg's statement is true as far as it goes, but it is not the whole truth. To make it the whole truth, we must add an additional clause: "And for bad people to do good things – that [also] takes religion." The main point of Christianity is that it is a religion for sinners. Jesus made that very clear. When the Pharisees asked his disciples, "Why eateth your Master with publicans and sinners?" he said, "I come to call not the righteous but sinners to repentance." Only a small fraction of sinners repent and do good things but only a small fraction of good people are led by their religion to do bad things.

— Dyson 2006c

Dyson identified himself as agnostic about some of the specifics of his faith. For example, in reviewing The God of Hope and the End of the World by John Polkinghorne, Dyson wrote:

I am myself a Christian, a member of a community that preserves an ancient heritage of great literature and great music, provides help and counsel to young and old when they are in trouble, educates children in moral responsibility, and worships God in its own fashion. But I find Polkinghorne's theology altogether too narrow for my taste. I have no use for a theology that claims to know the answers to deep questions but bases its arguments on the beliefs of a single tribe. I am a practicing Christian but not a believing Christian. To me, to worship God means to recognize that mind and intelligence are woven into the fabric of our universe in a way that altogether surpasses our comprehension.

— Dyson 2002a

Accepting the Templeton Prize, he said that

Science and religion are two windows that people look through, trying to understand the big universe outside, trying to understand why we are here. The two windows give different views, but they look out at the same universe. Both views are one-sided, and neither is complete. Both leave out essential features of the real world. And both are worthy of respect. Trouble arises when either science or religion claims universal jurisdiction when either religious or scientific dogma claims to be infallible. Religious creationists and scientific materialists are equally dogmatic and insensitive. By their arrogance, they bring both science and religion into disrepute. The media exaggerate their numbers and importance. The media rarely mention the fact that the great majority of religious people belong to moderate denominations that treat science with respect or the fact that the great majority of scientists treat religion with respect so long as religion does not claim jurisdiction over scientific questions.

I do not claim any ability to read God's mind. I am sure of only one thing. When we look at the glory of stars and galaxies in the sky and the glory of forests and flowers in the living world around us, it is evident that God loves diversity. Perhaps the universe is constructed according to a principle of maximum diversity. The principle of maximum diversity says that the laws of nature, and the initial conditions at the beginning of time, are such as to make the universe as interesting as possible. As a result, life is possible but not too easy. Maximum diversity often leads to maximum stress. In the end we survive, but only by the skin of our teeth. This is the confession of faith of a scientific heretic. Perhaps I may claim as evidence for progress in religion the fact that we no longer burn heretics.

== Named after Dyson ==
- Dyson conjecture
- Dyson equation
- Dyson numbers
- Dyson operator
- Dyson series
- Dyson sphere
- Dyson tree
- Dyson's crank
- Dyson's eternal intelligence
- Dyson's transform
- Dyson–Maleev spin wave theory
- Schwinger–Dyson equation
- Thue–Siegel–Dyson–Roth theorem
- Feynman diagram, also known as Dyson graphs
- Wigner–Yamase–Dyson conjecture
- Gordon Freeman, a fictional character named after Dyson

== Honors and awards ==
- Dyson was elected a Fellow of the Royal Society (FRS) in 1952.
- Dyson was elected to the American Academy of Arts and Sciences in 1958.
- Dyson was elected to the United States National Academy of Sciences in 1964.
- Dyson was awarded the Dannie Heineman Prize for Mathematical Physics in 1965, Lorentz Medal in 1966, Max Planck Medal in 1969, the J. Robert Oppenheimer Memorial Prize in 1970, the Harvey Prize in 1977 and Wolf Prize in 1981.
- Dyson was elected to the American Philosophical Society in 1976.
- In 1986, Dyson received the Golden Plate Award of the American Academy of Achievement.
- In 1989, Dyson was elected as an Honorary Fellow of Trinity College, University of Cambridge.
- In 1990, Dyson taught at Duke University as a Fritz London Memorial Lecturer.
- Dyson published a number of collections of speculations and observations about technology, science, and the future. In 1996, he was awarded the Lewis Thomas Prize for Writing about Science.
- In 1993, Dyson was given the Enrico Fermi Award.
- In 1995, he gave the Jerusalem-Harvard Lectures at the Hebrew University of Jerusalem, sponsored jointly by the Hebrew University and Harvard University Press that grew into the book Imagined Worlds.
- In 2000, Dyson was awarded the Templeton Prize for Progress in Religion.
- In 2003, Dyson was awarded the Telluride Tech Festival Award of Technology in Telluride, Colorado.
- In 2011, Dyson received as one of twenty distinguished Old Wykehamists at the Ad Portas celebration, the highest honor that Winchester College bestows.
- In 2011, Dyson received the Arthur C. Clarke Lifetime Achievement Award from the Arthur C. Clarke Foundation.
- In 2018, Dyson received the first Presidential Science and Humanism Award from the American University of Beirut.

== Publications ==
External videos
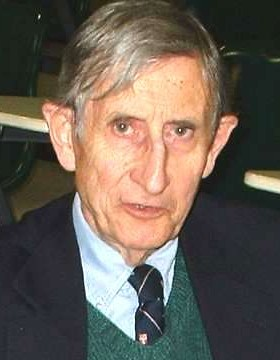
- Freeman Dyson: Let's look for life in the outer solar system, TED Talks, February 2003
- Freeman Dyson 1 – My middle class upbringing, Web of Stories (1st of a series)
- Big Ideas: Freeman Dyson on Living Through Four Revolutions, TVO, 1 June 2011 at Perimeter Institute, Waterloo, Canada

- "Some guesses in the theory of partitions" (PDF). Eureka. 8. Cambridge: 10–15. 1944. Archived (PDF) from the original on 10 June 2020.
- "On Simultaneous Diophantine Approximations". Proceedings of the London Mathematical Society. s2-49 (1): 409–420. 1946. doi:10.1112/plms/s2-49.6.409. ISSN 0024-6115.
- "The Approximation to Algebraic Numbers by Rationals" (PDF). Acta Mathematica. 79 (1). Uppsala: 225–240. 1947. doi:10.1007/BF02404697. S2CID 121579041. Archived (PDF) from the original on 25 November 2020.
- "Search for Artificial Stellar Sources of Infrared Radiation". Science. 131 (3414): 1667–1668. 3 June 1960. Bibcode:1960Sci...131.1667D. doi:10.1126/science.131.3414.1667. PMID 17780673. S2CID 3195432.
- "A Brownian-Motion Model for the Eigenvalues of a Random Matrix". Journal of Mathematical Physics. 3 (6): 1191–1198. 1962. Bibcode:1962JMP.....3.1191D. doi:10.1063/1.1703862. ISSN 0022-2488.
- Symmetry groups in nuclear and particle physics: a lecture-note and reprint volume. Benjamin. 1966.
- "Interstellar transport" (PDF). Physics Today. 21 (10): 41–45. 1968. Bibcode:1968PhT....21j..41D. doi:10.1063/1.3034534. ISSN 0031-9228. Archived (PDF) from the original on 5 June 2011.
- "Can we control the carbon dioxide in the atmosphere?". Energy. 2 (3): 287–291. 1977. Bibcode:1977Ene.....2..287D. doi:10.1016/0360-5442(77)90033-0.
- "Time without end: Physics and biology in an open universe". Reviews of Modern Physics. 51 (3): 447–460. 1979a. Bibcode:1979RvMP...51..447D. doi:10.1103/RevModPhys.51.447.
- Weapons and Hope. Harper & Row. 1984. ISBN 978-0-06-039031-0. (Winner of the National Book Critics Circle Award).
- Origins of Life. Cambridge University Press. 1985. ISBN 978-0-521-30949-3.
- Infinite in All Directions: Gifford Lectures Given at Aberdeen, Scotland, April-November 1985. Harper & Row. 1988. ISBN 978-0-06-039081-5. https://books.google.com/books?id=4ZwEAQAAIAAJ.
- From Eros to Gaia. Pantheon Books. 1992. arXiv:quant-ph/0608140.
- "Some Guesses in The Theory of Partitions". Selected Papers of Freeman Dyson with Commentary. American Mathematical Soc. 1996. ISBN 978-0-8218-0561-9.
- "Warm-blooded plants and freeze-dried fish: the future of space exploration". The Atlantic Monthly. November 1997.
- Imagined Worlds. Harvard University Press. 1997b. ISBN 978-0-674-53908-2.
- Imagined Worlds. The Jerusalem-Harvard Lectures. Harvard University Press. 1998. ISBN 9780674539099.
- L'importanza di essere imprevedibile [The importance of being unpredictable] (in Italian). Di Renzo. 1998b. ISBN 978-88-86044-95-0.
- The Sun, the Genome & the Internet: Tools of Scientific Revolutions. Oxford University Press. 1999. ISBN 978-0-19-512942-7. https://books.google.com/books?id=ioD-6SxGn0kC.
- Project Orion: The Atomic Spaceship 1957–1965. Allen Lane and Penguin. 2002. ISBN 978-0-14-188613-8. OCLC 51109229.
- "Science & Religion: No Ends in Sight – a review of The God of Hope and the End of the World by John Polkinghorne". The New York Review of Books. 28 March 2002a.
- "What Can You Really Know? a review of Jim Holt's 'Why Does the World Exist?'". The New York Review of Books. 8 November 2012.
- The Scientist as Rebel. New York Review Books. 2006. ISBN 978-1-59017-216-2. https://books.google.com/books?id=dfe_s_tK080C.
- "A Failure of Intelligence: Part I". MIT Technology Review. 1 November 2006a.
- "A Failure of Intelligence: Part II". MIT Technology Review. 5 December 2006b.
- "Religion from the Outside a review of Breaking the Spell: Religion as a Natural Phenomenon by Daniel C. Dennett". The New York Review of Books. 22 June 2006c.
- A Many-colored Glass: Reflections on the Place of Life in the Universe. University of Virginia Press. 2007. ISBN 978-0-8139-2663-6.
- "Our Biotech Future". The New York Review of Books. 19 July 2007b.
- Advanced Quantum Mechanics. World Scientific. 2007c. ISBN 978-981-270-661-4.
- "Birds and Frogs" (PDF). Notices of the American Mathematical Society. 56 (2): 212–223. February 2009. ISSN 1088-9477. Archived (PDF) from the original on 4 March 2011.
- Birds and Frogs: Selected Papers, 1990–2014. World Scientific. 2015. ISBN 978-981-4602-85-3.
- Dreams of Earth and Sky. New York Review Books. 2015a. ISBN 978-1-59017-855-3.
- "Freeman Dyson: By the Book". Sunday Book Review. The New York Times (Interview). 18 April 2015. p. 8.
- Maker of Patterns: An Autobiography Through Letters. Liveright. 2018. ISBN 978-0-87140-386-5.
- Dyson, F.J.; Gomer, R.; Weinberg, S.; Wright, S.C. (March 1967), Tactical Nuclear Weapons in Southeast Asia (PDF), Institute for Defense Analyses A formerly secret document, declassified December 2002.

== Documentaries ==
- To Mars by A-Bomb: The Secret History of Project Orion
- The Oakes
- Atomic Dream
- 2001: The Science of Futures Past
- Cool It
- Nuclear Dynamite
- Gaia Symphony III
- The Starship and the Canoe
- The Day After Trinity
- The Untold History of the United States
- The Uncertainty Has Settled
- A Glorious Accident
- Freeman Dyson: Space Dreamer
