= Hermann Boerner =

German mathematician (1906–1982)

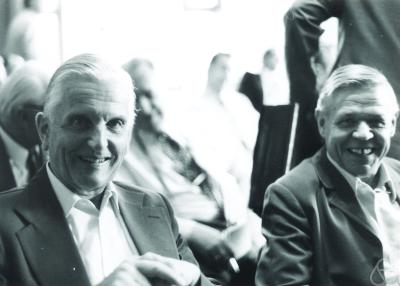
- Boerner (left) with Helmuth Gericke, Oberwolfach, 14 June 1975
- Born: 11 June 1906; Leipzig, German Empire
- Died: 3 June 1982 (aged 75); Göttingen, West Germany
- Scientific career
- Theses: Über einige Eigenwertprobleme und ihre Anwendung in der Variationsrechnung [On some eigenvalue problems and their application in the calculus of variations] (1932); Über die extremalen und geodätischen Felder in der Variationsrechnung in mehreren Variablen [On extremal and geodesic fields in the calculus of variations in multiple variables] (1934)
- Doctoral advisor: Leon Lichtenstein (1932); Constantin Carathéodory (1934)
- Doctoral students: Klaus W. Roggenkamp

Hermann Boerner (or Börner) (11 July 1906 – 3 June 1982) was a German mathematician who worked on variation calculus, complex analysis, and group representation theory.

== Publications ==
- Boerner Carathéodorys Eingang zur Variationsrechnung, Jahresbericht DMV 1953
- Boerner Variationsrechnung aus dem Stokesschen Satz, Mathematische Zeitschrift volume 46, 1940, page 709
- Boerner Über die Legendreschen Bedingungen und die Feldtheorie in der Variationsrechnung der mehrfachen Integrale, Mathem.Zeitschrift 1940, page 720
- Boerner Über die Extremalen und geodätischen Felder in der Variationsrechnung der mehrfachen Integrale, Mathematische Annalen volume 112, 1936, page 187
- Boerner Darstellungstheorie der endlichen Gruppen, Teubner 1967, Enzyklopädie der mathematischen Wissenschaften
- Boerner, Hermann (1970). Representations of groups, with special consideration for the needs of modern physics. Translated by P. G. Murphy (Second ed.). North-Holland Publishing.
