= From Eros to Gaia =

1992 book by Freeman Dyson

- First edition
- Author: Freeman Dyson
- Language: English
- Publisher: Pantheon Books
- Publication date: 1992
- Publication place: United States
- Pages: xi+371
- ISBN: 978-0-679-41307-3 (ebook) 978-0-307-83102-6
- OCLC: 25009511

From Eros to Gaia is a non-fiction scientific book of 35 non-technical writings by Freeman Dyson, Professor Emeritus of Physics at Princeton's Institute for Advanced Study. This book is a collection of essays written from 1933 (when Dyson was nine years old) to 1990. It was originally published by Pantheon Books in 1992.

The book begins with Dyson's juvenile 1933 science fiction story concerning the asteroid Eros. The pieces in the collection range over anecdotal history, expository popular-science articles, lectures on public policity related to science, political issues concerning problems created by science and technology, book reviews, and people (known personally by Dyson) such as Richard Feynman, Paul Dirac, and Helen Dukas. The book ends with Dyson's contribution Gaia to Clifton Fadiman's 1990 collection Living Philosophies. The concluding essay deals with the value and potential of the emerging Gaia philosophy.

Along with articles on quantum field theory and the mystery of unaccounted-for carbon in the biosphere, there are tributes to Richard Feynman and Paul Dirac, a travel sketch on Armenia and Dyson's proposed 60-year program for space science, including manned missions to Mars.

The book has been translated into Spanish (1994), French (1995), and Japanese (2005).
