= The Sun, the Genome, and the Internet =

1999 book by Freeman Dyson

- First edition
- Author: Freeman Dyson
- Language: English
- Publisher: Oxford University Press
- Publication date: 1999
- Publication place: United States
- Pages: 124
- ISBN: 0-19-513922-4
- OCLC: 59555991

The Sun, the Genome, and the Internet: Tools of Scientific Revolutions is a non-fiction scientific book by physicist Freeman Dyson, Professor Emeritus of Physics at the Institute for Advanced Study in the U.S. It was first published in 1999 by Oxford University Press, and is based on lectures he gave in 1997 at New York Public Library.

== Synopsis ==
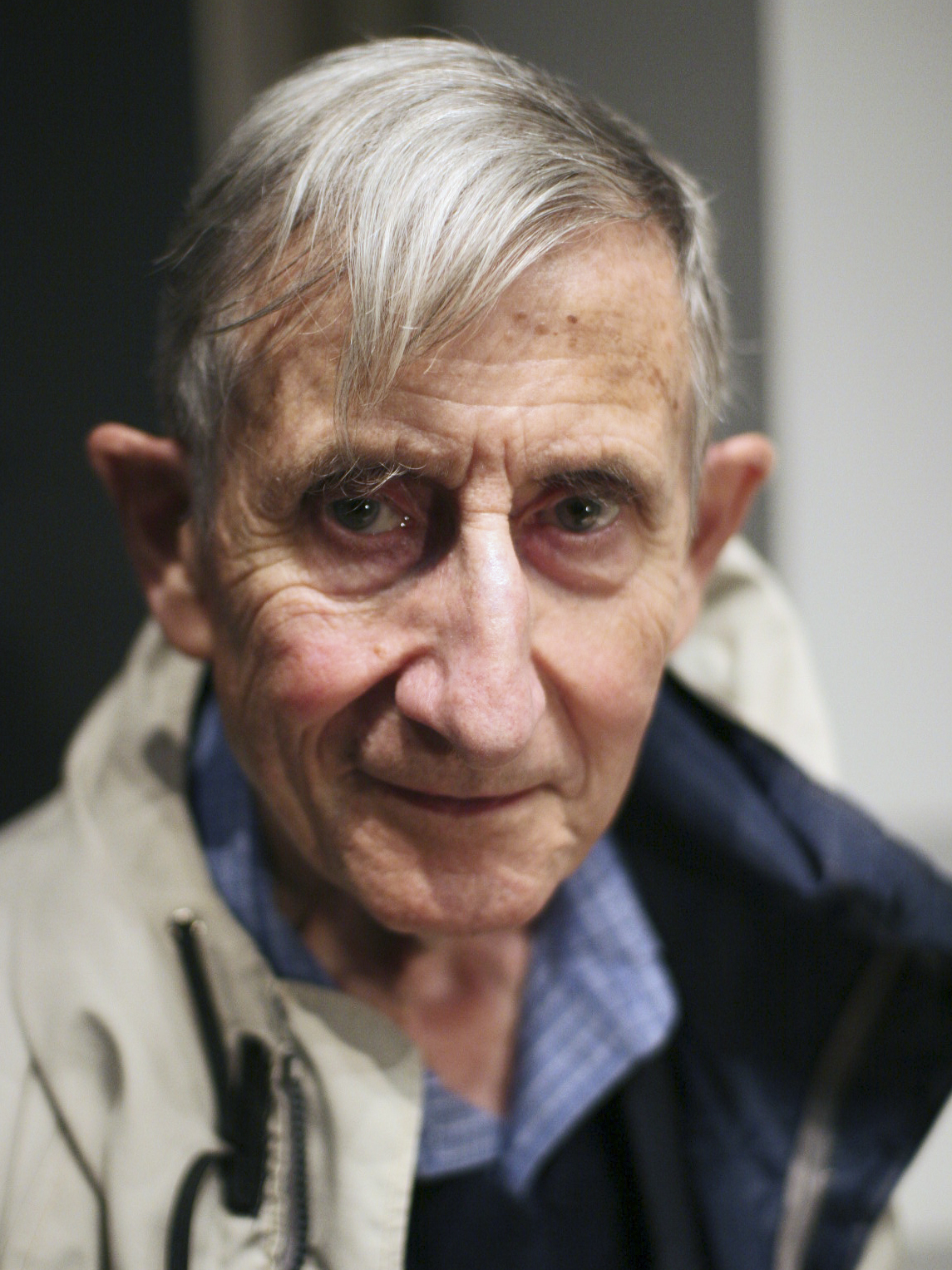
The author Freeman Dyson at the Long Now Seminar in San Francisco, California in 2005

Professor Dyson suggests that three rapidly advancing technologies, Solar Energy, Genetic Engineering and World-Wide Communication together have the potential to create a more equal distribution of the world's wealth. Amongst other things he proposes that solar power in the Third World could connect even the most remote areas to all of the information on the Internet, potentially ending the cultural isolation of the poorest countries. Likewise, breakthroughs in genetics could lead to more efficient crops, thereby engendering the renewed vitality of traditional village life, currently devalued by the global market.

== Reception ==
In the journal Science and Public Policy, Axel Gelfert called the book "original, engaging and positively unpretentious [...] which, while not always providing complete answers, asks many important questions." Langdon Winner, in Issues in Science and Technology, gave a negative review, writing that the "slapdash quality of the book's social analysis sometimes leads to ludicrous conclusions" and that it "regales readers with vague yearnings for a better world".

J. D. Biersdorfer of The New York Times Book Review wrote that Dyson wrote with "detailed, admirable conviction", while Kirkus Reviews praised Dyson's commentaries and prose.
