= Leon Lichtenstein =

Polish-German mathematician (1878–1933)

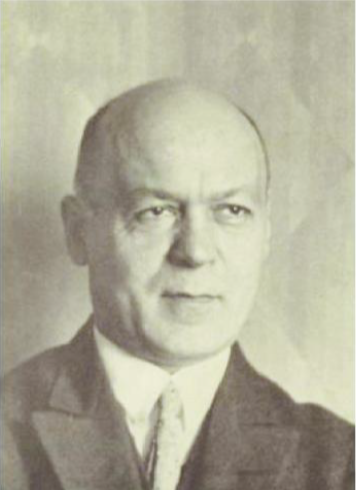
- Born: 16 May 1878; Warsaw, Russian Empire
- Died: 21 August 1933 (aged 55); Zakopane, Poland
- Education: University of Berlin
- Scientific career
- Fields: Mathematics
- Workplaces: University of Leipzig
- Doctoral advisor: Hermann Schwarz; Friedrich Schottky
- Doctoral students: Hermann Boerner; Ernst Hölder; Erich Kähler; Aurel Wintner

Leon Lichtenstein (16 May 1878 – 21 August 1933) was a Polish-German mathematician, who made contributions to the areas of differential equations, conformal mapping, and potential theory. He was also interested in theoretical physics, publishing research in hydrodynamics and astronomy.

== Life and work ==
Leon Lichtenstein was born on 16 May 1878 to an Ashkenazi Jewish family in Warsaw, then part of the Russian Empire. His cousin, Leo Wiener, was the father of MIT mathematician Norbert Wiener. He studied in Berlin, earning both a doctorate in mechanical and electrical engineering at the Technische Hochschule Berlin and a doctorate in mathematics at the Friedrich Wilhelm University with a thesis on differential equations written under the supervision of Hermann Schwarz and Friedrich Schottky. From 1902 he worked as an electrical engineer for Siemens & Halske; then, from 1910, he turned to the academic world by becoming privatdozent at the Berlin Technische Hochschule. Lichtenstein was one of the founders, in 1918, and the first editor of the journal Mathematische Zeitschrift. In 1920 he moved to a mathematics chair at the University of Münster and in 1922 he joined the University of Leipzig where he would spend the rest of his career. At the University of Leipzig, he founded a mathematical school and his students, including Ernst Hölder, Erich Kähler, Aurel Wintner, Hermann Boerner and Karl Maruhn, continued his research in mathematics and theoretical physics.

In 1933, as the Nazi party came to power in Germany, Lichtenstein abandoned his position at the university and left to Poland, as he would have been dismissed anyway for being Jewish. Shortly after, on 21 August 1933, he died of heart and kidney problems in Zakopane, in Poland.

== Bibliography ==
- Beiträge zur Theorie der Kabel- Untersuchungen zu den Kapazitätsverhältnissen von verseilten und konzentrischen Mehrfachkabeln. Oldenbourg, München 1908.
- Grundlagen der Hydromechanik. Springer, Berlin 1929. Reprint 1968.
- Gleichgewichtsfiguren rotierender Flüssigkeiten. Springer, Berlin 1933.
- Vorlesungen über einige Klassen nichtlinearer Integralgleichungen und Integro-Differentialgleichungen nebst Anwendungen. Springer, Berlin 1931.
- Astronomie und Mathematik in ihrer Wechselwirkung. Mathematische Probleme in der Theorie der Figur der Himmelskörper. 1922, Reprint: VDM, Saarbrücken 2007.

== See also ==
- Isothermal coordinates
- Symmetrizable compact operator

== Sources ==
- Jagdish Mehra, Helmut Rechenberg, The historical development of quantum theory, Springer, 2000, p. 418
- Sanford L. Segal, Mathematicians under the Nazis, Princeton University Press, 2003, p. 44
