= Infinite in All Directions =

1988 book by Freeman Dyson

- Cover of the first edition
- Author: Freeman Dyson
- Language: English
- Publisher: Harper & Row
- Publication date: 1988
- Media type: Print
- Pages: 329
- ISBN: 978-0-06-039081-5
- OCLC: 16406078

Infinite In All Directions (1988) is a book on a wide range of subjects, including history, philosophy, research, technology, the origin of life and eschatology, by theoretical physicist Freeman Dyson. The book is based on the author's Gifford Lectures delivered in Aberdeen in 1985. Infinite in All Directions can roughly be summarized as a treatise on the universe and humanity's role and its responsibilities.

The lectures were given in two series, and this book is accordingly divided into two parts. Part 1 is about life as a scientific phenomenon, about our efforts to understand the nature of life and its place in the universe. Part 2 is about ethics and politics, about the local problems introduced by our species into the existence of life on this planet.

Freeman Dyson is Professor of Physics at Princeton’s Institute for Advanced Study. That is a title, not a recommendation. What recommends him is his ability to communicate, not merely the interest of science and its application to human activities of every kind, but the sheer delight he takes in the universe. He loves diversity. Frequently throughout the book a passage will reveal his pleasure at being alive and seeing and thinking. He has much of Richard Feynman’s enthusiasm for the strangeness of people and things.
