= Affine Grassmannian =

In mathematics, the affine Grassmannian of an algebraic group G over a field k is an ind-scheme—a colimit of finite-dimensional schemes—which can be thought of as a flag variety for the loop group G(k((t))) and which describes the representation theory of the Langlands dual group ^{L}G through what is known as the geometric Satake correspondence.

== Definition of Gr via functor of points ==
Let k be a field, and denote by $k\text{-Alg}$ and $\mathrm{Set}$ the category of commutative k-algebras and the category of sets respectively. Through the Yoneda lemma, a scheme X over a field k is determined by its functor of points, which is the functor $X:k\text{-Alg} \to \mathrm{Set}$ which takes A to the set X(A) of A-points of X. We then say that this functor is representable by the scheme X. The affine Grassmannian is a functor from k-algebras to sets which is not itself representable, but which has a filtration by representable functors. As such, although it is not a scheme, it may be thought of as a union of schemes, and this is enough to profinitely apply geometric methods to study it.

Let G be an algebraic group over k. The affine Grassmannian Gr_{G} is the functor that associates to a k-algebra A the set of isomorphism classes of pairs (E, φ), where E is a principal homogeneous space for G over Spec A[[t]] and φ is an isomorphism, defined over Spec A((t)), of E with the trivial G-bundle G × Spec A((t)). By the Beauville–Laszlo theorem, it is also possible to specify this data by fixing an algebraic curve X over k, a k-point x on X, and taking E to be a G-bundle on X_{A} and φ a trivialization on (X − x)_{A}. When G is a reductive group, Gr_{G} is in fact ind-projective, i.e., an inductive limit of projective schemes.

== Definition as a coset space ==
Let us denote by $\mathcal K = k((t))$ the field of formal Laurent series over k, and by $\mathcal O = k[[t]]$ the ring of formal power series over k. By choosing a trivialization of E over all of $\operatorname{Spec}\mathcal O$, the set of k-points of Gr_{G} is identified with the coset space $G(\mathcal K) / G(\mathcal O)$.
