= Mathematische Zeitschrift =

- Discipline: Mathematics
- Language: English
- Edited by: Joel Kamnitzer

Publication details
- History: 1918–present
- Publisher: Springer Verlag (Germany)
- Impact factor: 0.881 (2019)

Standard abbreviations
- ISO 4: Math. Z.

Indexing
- CODEN: MAZEAX
- ISSN: 0025-5874 (print); 1432-1823 (web)

Links
- Journal homepage

Mathematische Zeitschrift (German for Mathematical Journal) is a mathematical journal for pure and applied mathematics published by Springer Verlag.

== History ==
The journal was founded in 1917, with its first issue appearing in 1918. It was initially edited by Leon Lichtenstein together with Konrad Knopp, Erhard Schmidt, and Issai Schur. Because Lichtenstein was Jewish, he was forced to step down as editor in 1933 under the Nazi rule of Germany; he fled to Poland and died soon after. The editorship was offered to Helmut Hasse, but he refused, and Konrad Knopp took it over. Other past editors include Erich Kamke, Friedrich Karl Schmidt, Rolf Nevanlinna, Helmut Wielandt, and Olivier Debarre.
