= George Dyson (science historian) =

American author and historian of technology (born 1953)

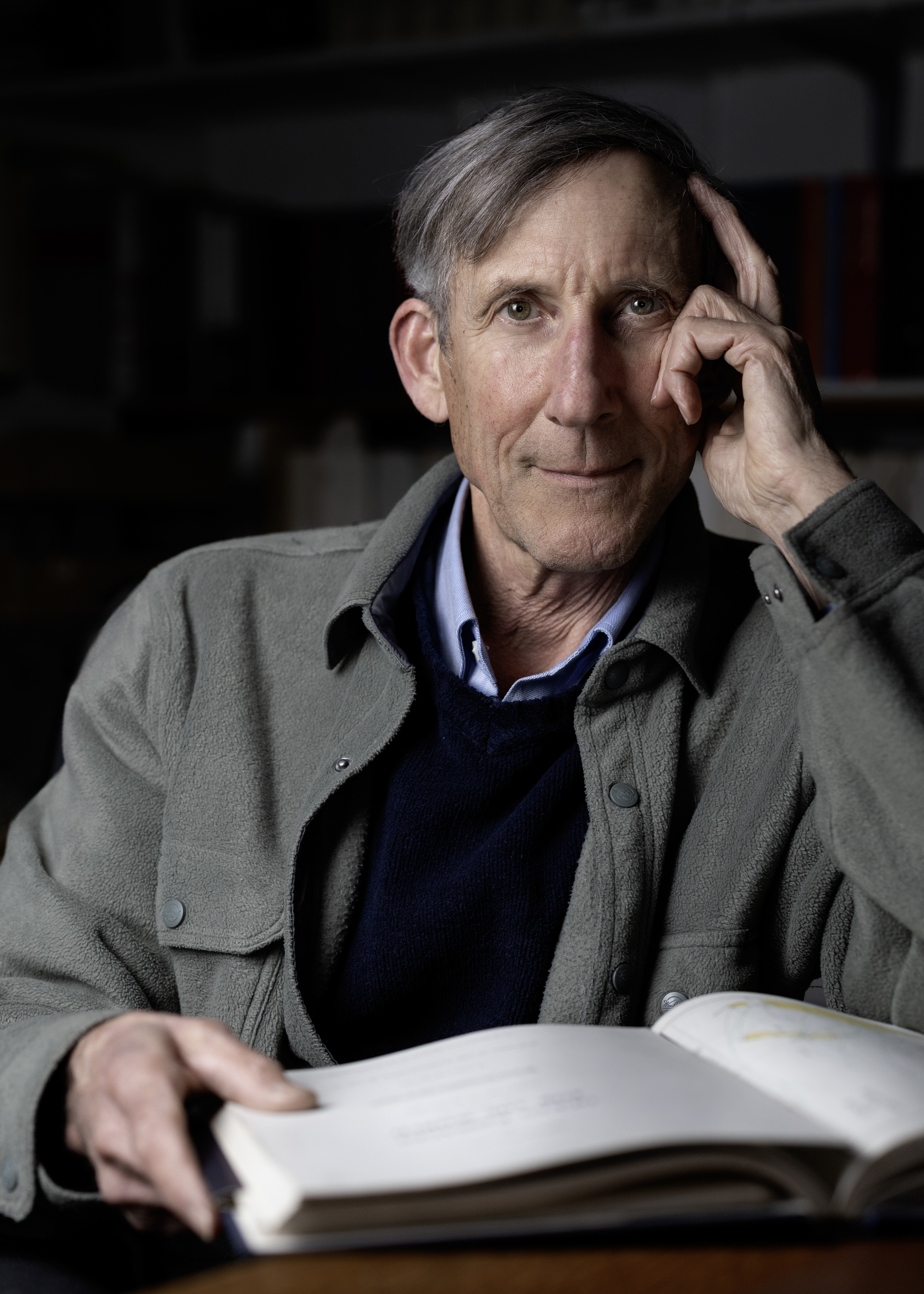
- Dyson at his workshop in 2025
- Born: March 26, 1953 (age 73); Ithaca, New York, U.S.
- Occupations: Science historian, writer, boat designer, builder
- Children: Lauren
- Parents: Freeman Dyson (father); Verena Huber-Dyson (mother)
- Relatives: Sir George Dyson (grandfather); Esther Dyson (sister)

George Dyson (born March 26, 1953) is an American non-fiction author and historian of technology whose publications broadly cover the evolution of technology in relation to the physical environment and the direction of society.

He has written on a wide range of topics, including the history of computing, the development of algorithms and intelligence, communications systems, space exploration, and the design of watercraft.

== Early life and education ==
Dyson's early life is described in Kenneth Brower's book The Starship and the Canoe. When he was sixteen he went to live in British Columbia to pursue his interest in kayaking.

From 1972 to 1975, he lived in a treehouse at a height of 30 metres that he built from salvaged materials on the shore of Burrard Inlet. Dyson became a Canadian citizen and spent 20 years in British Columbia, designing kayaks, researching historic voyages and native peoples, and exploring the Inside Passage. He was, during this period, estranged from his father for some time.

== Career ==
"What if the cost of machines that think is people who don't?"

— George Dyson

Dyson's first book, Baidarka, published in 1986, described his research on the history of the Aleutian kayak, its evolution in the hands of Russian fur traders, and his adaptation of its design to modern materials. He is the author of Project Orion: The Atomic Spaceship 1957–1965 and Darwin Among the Machines: The Evolution of Global Intelligence, in which he expands upon the premise of Samuel Butler's 1863 article of the same name and suggests that the Internet is a living, sentient being. His 2012 book Turing's Cathedral has been described as "a creation myth of the digital universe." It was a finalist for the Los Angeles Times 2012 Book Prize in the science and technology category and was chosen by University of California Berkeley's annual "On the Same Page" program for the academic year 2013–14.

Dyson is the founder/owner of Dyson, Baidarka & Company, a designer of Aleut-style skin kayaks; he is credited with the revival of the baidarka style of kayak.

Dyson was a visiting lecturer and research associate at Western Washington University's Fairhaven College and was Director's Visitor at the Institute for Advanced Study in Princeton, New Jersey, in 2002–03. He was a frequent contributor to Edge.org between 1998 and 2019.

=== Turing's Cathedral ===
Turing's Cathedral is Dyson's fourth book. Though Alan Turing is in the title, the book focuses on John von Neumann and his 1946 attempt to build a computer at Princeton's Institute for Advanced Study (known as the IAS machine, MANIAC I was the same machine later built at Los Alamos Laboratory). Dyson interviewed several people who knew von Neumann, including his father, Freeman Dyson. The book received mostly positive reviews. Brian E. Blank noted in his review "[e]xtensive biographical and institutional backgrounds", and concludes it with:

It is difficult to avoid the conclusion that Turing's Cathedral is an idiosyncratic, undisciplined, crazy quilt of a book. The reviewer had no preconceived notions about the sort of book that might be authored by a man who once lived for three years in a treehouse 95 feet above the ground, but the eccentricities of Turing's Cathedral do not seem inconsistent with what might be imagined. And yet, for all its flaws, shortcomings, and waywardness, it is a book that amply rewards its readers.

=== Media appearances ===
- To Mars by A-Bomb: The Secret History of Project Orion (BBC, 2003)
- The Starship and the Canoe (1986)

=== Books ===
- Baidarka the Kayak
- Darwin Among the Machines
- Project Orion: The Atomic Spaceship 1957–1965
- Turing's Cathedral
- Analogia: The Entangled Destinies of Nature, Human Beings and Machines

== Personal life ==
George Dyson's parents were the theoretical physicist Freeman Dyson and mathematician Verena Huber-Dyson. He is the brother of technology analyst Esther Dyson, and the grandson of the composer George Dyson.

George Dyson and Ann Yow-Dyson have a daughter. Since 1989, George has lived and worked in Bellingham, Washington.
