= Jung's theorem =

Theorem relating the diameter of a point set to the minimum radius of an enclosing ball

In geometry, Jung's theorem is an inequality between the diameter of a set of points in any Euclidean space and the radius of the minimum enclosing ball of that set. It is named after Heinrich Jung, who first studied this inequality in 1901. Algorithms also exist to solve the smallest-circle problem explicitly.

== Statement ==
Consider a compact set

$$K \subset \mathbb{R}^n$$

and let

$$d = \max_{p,q\,\in\, K} \| p - q \|_2$$

be the diameter of K, that is, the largest Euclidean distance between any two of its points. Jung's theorem states that there exists a closed ball with radius

$$r \leq d \sqrt{\frac{n}{2(n+1)}}$$

that contains K. The boundary case of equality is attained by the regular n-simplex.

== Jung's theorem in the plane ==
The most common case of Jung's theorem is in the plane, that is, when n = 2. In this case the theorem states that there exists a circle enclosing all points whose radius satisfies

$$r \leq \frac{d}{\sqrt{3}},$$

and this bound is as tight as possible since when K is an equilateral triangle (or its three vertices) one has $r = \frac{d}{\sqrt{3}}.$

== General metric spaces ==
For any bounded set $S$ in any metric space, $d/2\le r\le d$. The first inequality is implied by the triangle inequality for the center of the ball and the two diametral points, and the second inequality follows since a ball of radius $d$ centered at any point of $S$ will contain all of $S$. Both these inequalities are tight:

- In a uniform metric space, that is, a space in which all distances are equal, $r=d$.
- At the other end of the spectrum, in an injective metric space such as the Manhattan distance in the plane, $r=d/2$: any two closed balls of radius $d/2$ centered at points of $S$ have a non-empty intersection, therefore all such balls have a common intersection, and a radius $d/2$ ball centered at a point of this intersection contains all of $S$.

Versions of Jung's theorem for various non-Euclidean geometries are also known (see e.g. Dekster 1995, 1997).
