= Arnaud Beauville =

French mathematician (born 1947)

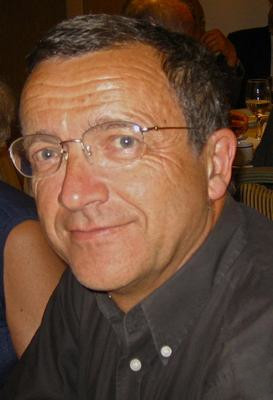
- Born: 10 May 1947 (age 79); Boulogne-Billancourt, Paris, France
- Education: Paris Diderot University
- Scientific career
- Fields: Mathematics
- Workplaces: University of Nice Sophia Antipolis; Paris-Sud 11 University; University of Angers
- Doctoral advisor: Jean-Louis Verdier
- Doctoral students: Olivier Debarre; Yves Laszlo; Claire Voisin

Arnaud Beauville (born 10 May 1947) is a French mathematician, whose research interest is algebraic geometry.

Beauville earned his doctorate from Paris Diderot University in 1977, with a thesis regarding Prym varieties and the Schottky problem, under supervision of Jean-Louis Verdier.

He has been a professor at the Université Paris-Sud, then Director of the Mathematics Department at the École Normale Supérieure. He is currently Professor emeritus at the Université de Nice Sophia-Antipolis.

Beauville was a visiting scholar at the Institute for Advanced Study in the summer of 1982. He was an invited speaker at the International Congress of Mathematicians in 1986 at Berkeley. He was a member of Bourbaki. He has had 25 Ph.D. students, among them Claire Voisin, Olivier Debarre, Yves Laszlo.

In 2012 he became a fellow of the American Mathematical Society.

== See also ==
- Beauville surface
