= Prime form =

In algebraic geometry, the Schottky–Klein prime form E(x,y) of a compact Riemann surface X depends on two elements x and y of X, and vanishes if and only if x = y. The prime form E is not quite a holomorphic function on X × X, but is a section of a holomorphic line bundle over this space. Prime forms were introduced by Friedrich Schottky and Felix Klein.

Prime forms can be used to construct meromorphic functions on X with given poles and zeros. If Σn_{i}a_{i} is a divisor linearly equivalent to 0, then ΠE(x,a_{i})^{n_{i}} is a meromorphic function with given poles and zeros.

== See also ==
- Fay's trisecant identity
