= Yves Laszlo =

French mathematician

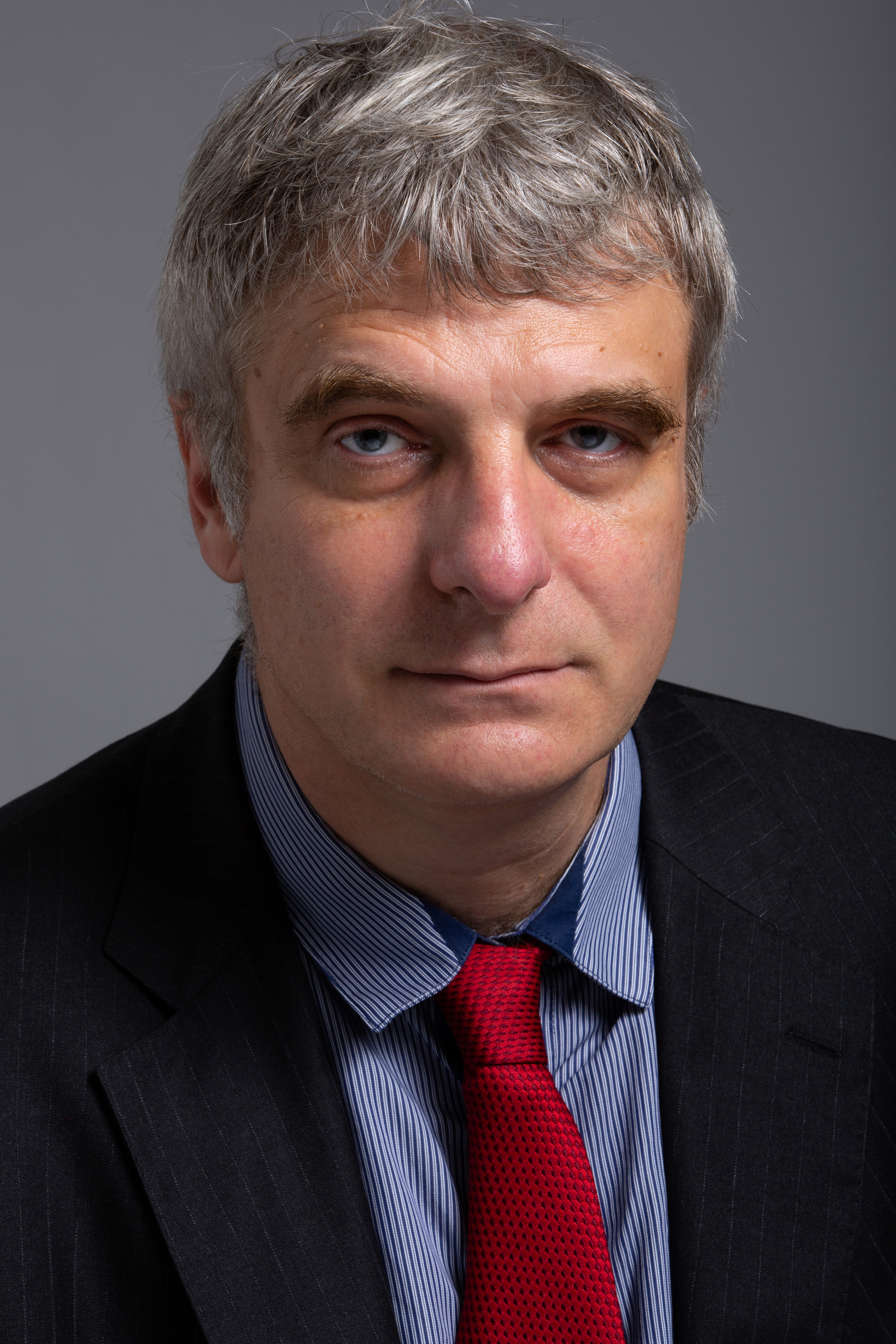
- Born: 4 April 1964 (age 62); Paris, France
- Education: Paris-Sud University
- Occupation: Mathematician

Yves Laszlo (French pronunciation: [iv laslo] born 4 April 1964) is a French mathematician working in the University of Paris-Sud. He specializes in algebraic geometry.

Laszlo obtained his Ph.D. in 1988 from the University of Paris-Sud under the supervision of Arnaud Beauville. He started the Fondation Mathématique Jacques Hadamard in 2011, and directed it until 2012.

The Beauville–Laszlo theorem on gluing sheaves together is named after Laszlo and Beauville, who published it in 1995.
