= Schottky's theorem =

In mathematical complex analysis, Schottky's theorem, introduced by Schottky (1904) is a quantitative version of Picard's theorem. It states that for a holomorphic function f in the open unit disk that does not take the values 0 or 1, the value of |f(z)| can be bounded in terms of z and f(0).

Schottky's original theorem did not give an explicit bound for f. Ostrowski (1931, 1933) gave some weak explicit bounds. Ahlfors (1938, theorem B) gave a strong explicit bound, showing that if f is holomorphic in the open unit disk and does not take the values 0 or 1, then

$$\log |f(z)| \le \frac{1+|z|}{1-|z|}(7+\max(0,\log |f(0)|))$$.

Several authors, such as Jenkins (1955), have given variations of Ahlfors's bound with better constants: in particular Hempel (1980) gave some bounds whose constants are in some sense the best possible.
