= The Scientist as Rebel =

2006 book by Freeman Dyson

- Author: Freeman Dyson
- Language: English
- Publication date: 2006

The Scientist as Rebel is a 2006 book by theoretical physicist Freeman Dyson. A few of the twenty-nine chapters in the book deal with the interactions of religion and science.

The book is a collection of essays, prefaces, and book reviews concerning miscellaneous topics. Its title is taken from the title of an essay which originated as a November 1992 talk at a Cambridge, UK meeting of scientists and philosophers. Dyson dedicated his talk to the memory of Eric James, Baron James of Rusholme, who died in May 1992.

The book's four sections—"Contemporary Issues in Science," "War and Peace," "History of Science and Scientists," "Personal and Philosophical"—contain information about the author's life, and the general tone is optimistic. He believes that biological engineering will inevitably be enlisted to enhance species or even create new ones (microbes that clean up pollution, for example) and that humans will colonize space.
