= Esther Dyson =

American journalist (born 1951)

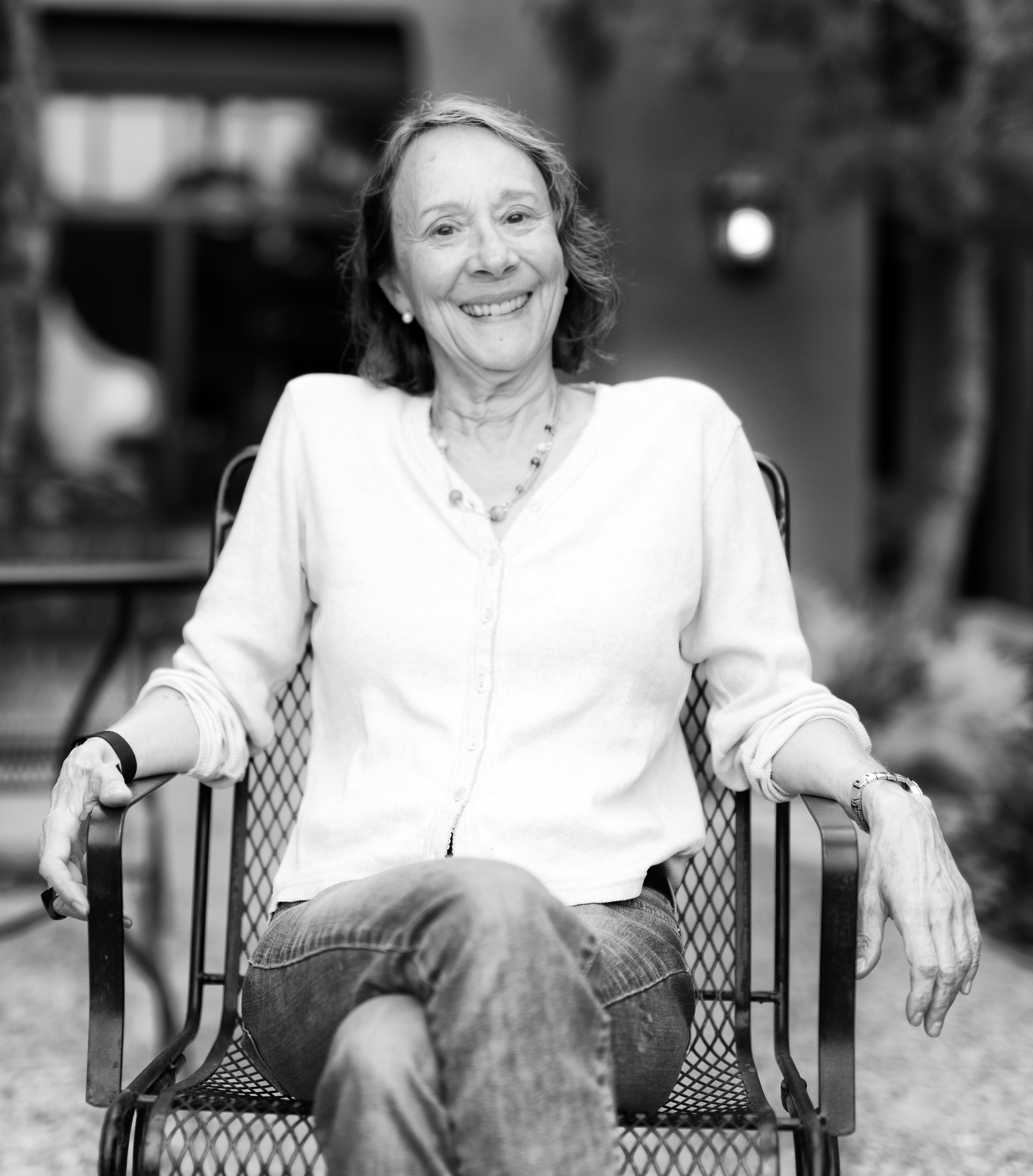
- Esther Dyson in 2018 at the Clock of the Long Now
- Born: 14 July 1951 (age 75); Zürich, Switzerland
- Education: Harvard University
- Parents: Freeman Dyson (father); Verena Huber-Dyson (mother)
- Relatives: George Dyson (grandfather); George Dyson (brother)
- Website: edventure.com

Esther Dyson (born 14 July 1951) is an American investor, journalist, author, commentator and philanthropist. Until 2024, she was the executive founder of Wellville, a nonprofit project focused on improving equitable wellbeing. Dyson is also an angel investor focused on health care, open government, digital technology, biotechnology, and outer space. Dyson's career now focuses on health and she continues to invest in health and technology startups.

== Early life and education ==
Esther Dyson's father was English-born, American-naturalized physicist Freeman Dyson, and her mother was mathematician Verena Huber-Dyson, of Swiss parentage; her brother is science historian George Dyson. Her paternal grandfather was the composer Sir George Dyson. She was educated at Harvard University, where she studied economics and wrote for The Harvard Crimson.

== Career ==
After graduating she joined Forbes as a fact-checker and quickly rose to reporter. In 1977, she joined New Court Securities following Federal Express and other start-ups. After a stint at Oppenheimer Holdings covering software companies, she moved to Rosen Research in 1982, at which time they launched PC Forum (originally the Personal Computer Forum) a highly influential annual invitation-only high tech conference that ran from 1982 until 2007. From 1982 until the early 1990s, it served as the premier networking and brainstorming hub for tech visionaries, venture capitalists and industry executives. Many of the eventual major startups in Silicon Valley obtained their initial funding at PC Forum events.

In 1983, when she bought the company from her employer Ben Rosen, Dyson renamed the company EDventure Holdings and his Rosen Electronic Letter newsletter Release 1.0. She and business partner Daphne Kis sold EDventure Holdings to CNET Networks in 2004 and left CNET in January 2007.

On 7 October 2008, Space Adventures announced that Dyson had paid to train as a back-up spaceflight participant for Charles Simonyi's trip to the International Space Station aboard the Soyuz TMA-14 mission which took place in 2009.

In 1997, Dyson wrote that as of that time she had never voted. The tagline of her email signature block reads “Always make new mistakes”.

=== Publications and business ventures ===
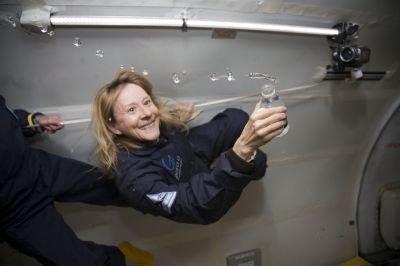
Dyson said, "I'm flying!", 2007 courtesy Zero-G

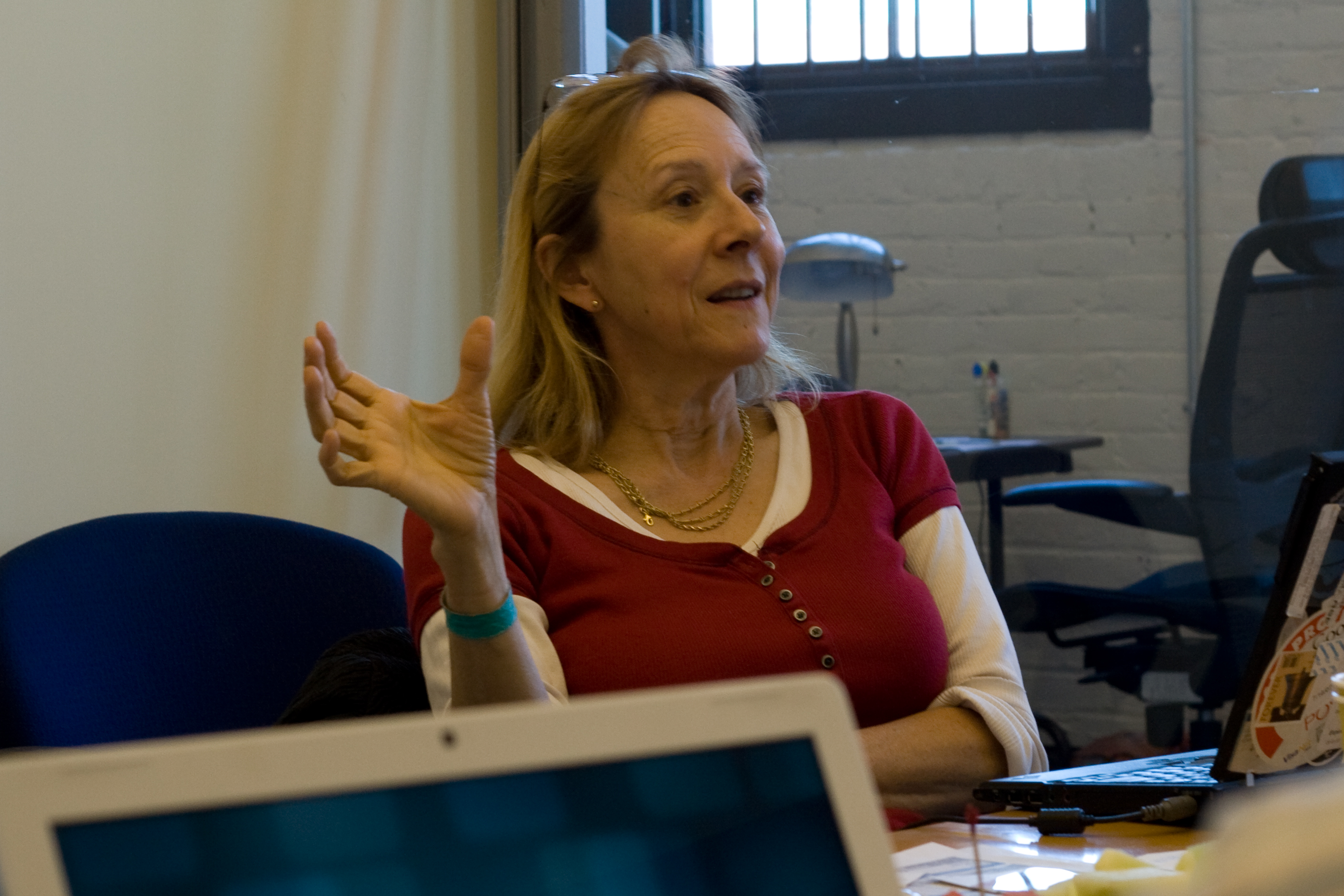
Dyson in 2007

Currently, Dyson is a board member and active investor in a variety of start-ups, mostly in online services, health care, logistics, artificial intelligence, emerging markets, and space travel. She was a board member of Yandex until March 2022.

Previously, Dyson and her company EDventure Holdings specialized in analyzing the effect of emerging technologies and markets on economies and societies. She produced the following publications on technology:

- Release 1.0, her monthly technology-industry newsletter. Until 2006, Dyson wrote most issues herself and edited the others.
- Rel-EAST, a sister newsletter focused on the technology industry in Eastern Europe.
- Release 2.0, her 1997 book on how the Internet affects individuals' lives. Its full title is Release 2.0: A Design for Living in the Digital Age. The revision Release 2.1 was published in 1998.
- Term Limits: Time and Scale in the Age of AI: how AI is impacting women's healthcare.

=== Philanthropy ===
Interview with Dyson on her time as the board chair of ICANN

Dyson is an active member of a number of non-profit and advisory organizations. From 1998 to 2000, she was the founding chairman of ICANN, the Internet Corporation for Assigned Names and Numbers. As of 2004, she sat on its "reform" committee (the At-Large Advisory Committee), dedicated to defining a role for individuals in ICANN's decision-making and governance structures. She opposed ICANN's 2012 expansion of generic top-level domains (gTLDs). She has followed closely the post-Soviet transition of Eastern Europe, from 2002 to 2012 was a member of the Bulgarian president's IT Advisory Council, along with Vint Cerf, George Sadowsky, and Veni Markovski, among others. She has served as a trustee of, and helped fund, emerging organizations such as Glasses for Humanity, Bridges.org, the National Endowment for Democracy, the Eurasia Foundation, StopBadware, and the Sunlight Foundation. She was previously a member of the Global Business Network.

=== Other pursuits ===
Dyson was one of the first ten volunteers for the Personal Genome Project.

Dyson has served as a judge for Mayor Michael Bloomberg's NYC BigApps competition in New York.

== See also ==
- Space Adventures clients who trained, but did not fly in space
