= Verena Huber-Dyson =

Swiss-American mathematician (1923–2016)

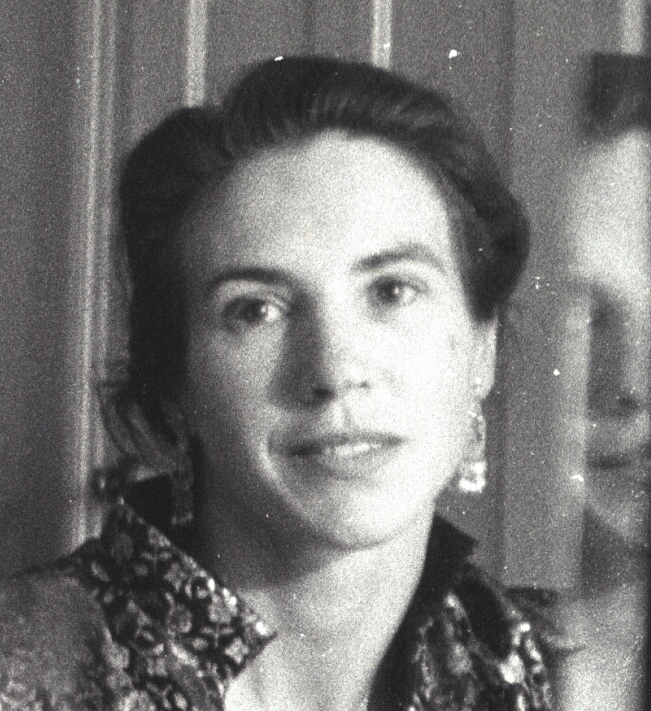
- Born: Verena Esther Huber; May 6, 1923; Naples, Italy
- Died: March 12, 2016 (aged 92); Bellingham, Washington
- Other names: Verena Huber, Verena Haefeli
- Citizenship: Switzerland; United States
- Education: University of Zürich
- Known for: Group theory; Mathematical logic
- Spouses: Hans-Georg Haefeli (m. 1942; div. 1948); Freeman Dyson (m. 1950; div. 1958)
- Children: Katarina Halm; Esther Dyson; George Dyson
- Scientific career
- Fields: Logic, algebra
- Institutions: University of California, Berkeley; Adelphi University; University of California, Los Angeles; University of Illinois at Urbana–Champaign; University of Calgary
- Thesis: Ein Dualismus als Klassifikationsprinzip in der abstrakten Gruppentheorie (1947)
- Doctoral advisor: Andreas Speiser

Verena Esther Huber-Dyson (née Huber; May 6, 1923 – March 12, 2016) was a Swiss-American mathematician, known for her work on group theory and formal logic. She has been described as a "brilliant mathematician", who did research on the interface between algebra and logic, focusing on undecidability in group theory. At the time of her death, she was emeritus faculty in the philosophy department of the University of Calgary, Alberta.

== Biography ==
=== Early life and education ===
Huber-Dyson was born Verena Esther Huber in Naples, Italy, on May 6, 1923. Her parents, Karl (Charles) Huber (1893–1946) and Berthy Ryffel (1899–1945), were Swiss nationals who raised Verena and her sister Adelheid ("Heidi", 1925–1987) in Athens, Greece, where the girls attended the German-speaking Deutsche Schule, or German School of Athens, until forced to return to Switzerland in 1940 by the war.

Charles Huber, who had managed the Middle Eastern operations of Bühler AG, a Swiss food-process engineering firm, began working for the International Committee of the Red Cross (ICRC), monitoring the treatment of prisoners of war in internment camps. As the ICRC delegate to India and Ceylon, he was responsible for Italian prisoners held in British camps, but also visited German and Allied camps in Europe. In 1945-46 he served as an ICRC delegate to the United States, which he described to Verena as a place she "definitely ought to experience at length and in depth but just as definitely ought not to settle in."

She studied mathematics, with minors in physics and philosophy, at the University of Zurich, where she obtained her Ph.D. in mathematics in 1947 with a thesis in finite group theory under the supervision of Andreas Speiser.

=== Career ===
Huber-Dyson accepted a postdoctoral fellow appointment at the Institute for Advanced Study in Princeton in 1948, where she worked on group theory and formal logic. She also began teaching at Goucher College near Baltimore during this time.

She moved to California with her daughter Katarina, began teaching at San Jose State University in 1959, and then joined Alfred Tarski's Group in Logic and the Methodology of Science at the University of California, Berkeley.

Huber-Dyson taught at San Jose State University, the University of Zürich, Monash University, as well as at University of California, Berkeley, Adelphi University, University of California, Los Angeles, and the University of Illinois at Chicago, in mathematics and in philosophy departments. She accepted a position in the philosophy department of the University of Calgary in 1973, becoming emerita in 1988.

==== Academic affiliations prior to June 1968 ====
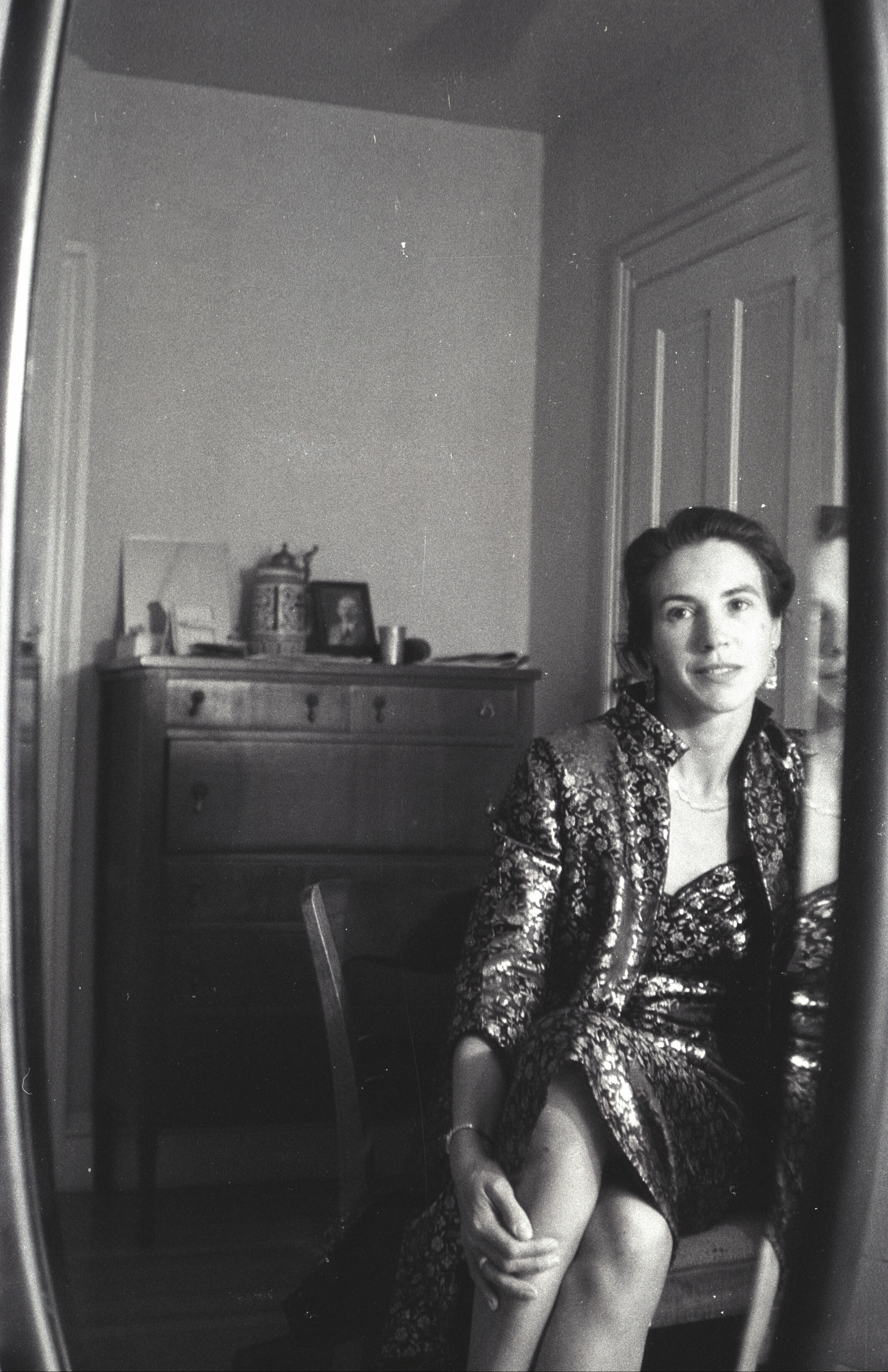
Self-portrait, 1954

- Cornell University
- Goucher College
- San Jose State University (September 1959)
- Adelphi University
- UCLA
- University of London
- ETH Zürich
- Warwick University
- University of Melbourne
- Monash University
- Australian National University in Canberra
- University of Zürich
- Mills College
- UC Berkeley

==== Academic affiliations after September 1968 ====
- Department of Mathematics, University of Illinois at Chicago (September 1968 – June 1971) tenure-track Assistant Professor
- Department of Philosophy, University of Calgary (September 1971 –June 1972) nontenure-track
- Department of Mathematics, University of Illinois at Chicago (September 1972 – June 1973) tenured Associate Professor
- Department of Philosophy, University of Calgary (September 1973 – June 1975) tenure-track Assistant Professor
- Department of Philosophy, University of Calgary (September 1977 – June 1981) tenured Associate Professor.
- Department of Philosophy, University of Calgary (September 1981 – June 1988) Full Professor
- Department of Philosophy, University of Calgary (September 1988 – March 2016) Emerita Professor

=== Activities while at Calgary ===
- Taught graduate courses on foundations of mathematics and the philosophy and methodology of the sciences
- Began work on the monograph, Gödel's theorems: a workbook on formalization

=== Non-academic employment ===
- Consultant for Remington Rand (Univac) in Philadelphia
- Consultant for Hughes Aircraft in Los Angeles

=== Later life ===
External image
- Verena Huber-Dyson
- Later life,

After retiring from Calgary, Verena Huber-Dyson moved back to South Pender Island in British Columbia, where she lived for 14 years. She died on March 12, 2016, in Bellingham, Washington, at the age of 92.

=== Personal life ===
External image
- Verena Huber-Dyson
- New Jersey, 1949,

Verena married Hans-Georg Haefeli, a fellow mathematician, in 1942, and was divorced in 1948. Her first daughter was born in 1945.

She subsequently married Freeman Dyson in Ann Arbor, Michigan, on August 11, 1950. They had two children together, Esther Dyson and George Dyson, and divorced in 1958.

== Selected publications ==
"There is more to truth than can be caught by proof".

— Roberts 2016

=== Monographs ===
- Haefeli-Huber, Verena Esther (1948). Ein Dualismus als Klassifikationsprinzip in der abstrakten Gruppentheorie [A dualism as a classification principle in abstract group theory] (PhD) (in German). Zurich University. OCLC 2277810.
- Roggenkamp, Klaus W.; Huber-Dyson, Verena (1970). Lattices over Orders I. Lecture Notes in Mathematics (No 115). Springer-Verlag. doi:10.1007/BFb0068796. ISBN 978-3-540-04904-3.
- Huber-Dyson, Verena (1991). Gödel's Theorems: A Workbook on Formalization. 122 in Teubner-Texte zur Mathematik. B.G. Teubner Verlagsgesellschaft. ISBN 978-3-8154-2023-2.

=== Articles ===
External image
- Verena Huber-Dyson
- July 28, 2006

- Huber-Dyson, Verena; Kreisel, Georg (1961). "Analysis of Beth's Semantic Construction of Intuitionistic Logic". Stanford Research Report. 3.
- Huber-Dyson, Verena (1964). "On the Decision Problem for Theories of Finite Models". Israel Journal of Mathematics. 2 (1): 55–70. doi:10.1007/bf02759735. S2CID 122395102.
- Huber-Dyson, Verena (1965). "Strong representability of Number-Theoretic Functions". Hughes Aircraft Report.
- Huber-Dyson, Verena (1969). "On the Decision Problem for Extensions of a Decidable Theory". Fundamenta Mathematicae. 64: 7–40. doi:10.4064/fm-64-1-7-40.
- Huber-Dyson, Verena (1974). "A Family of Groups with Nice Word Problems". Journal of the Australian Mathematical Society. 17.
- Huber-Dyson, Verena (1977). "Talking about Free Groups in Naturally Enriched Languages". Communications in Algebra. 5 (11): 1163–1191. doi:10.1080/00927877708822214.
- Huber-Dyson, Verena (1979). "An Inductive Theory for Free Products of Groups". Algebra Universalis. 9: 35–44. doi:10.1007/BF02488014. S2CID 119943802.
- Huber-Dyson, Verena (1981). "A Reduction of the Open Sentence Problem for Finite Groups". Bulletin of the London Mathematical Society. 13 (4): 331–338. doi:10.1112/blms/13.4.331.
- Huber-Dyson, Verena (1982). "Symmetric Groups and the Open Sentence Problem". Patras Logic Symposium. North-Holland.
- Huber-Dyson, Verena (1982). "Finiteness Conditions and the Word Problem". Groups St. Andrews 1981. LMS Lecture Notes. Vol. 71.
- Huber-Dyson, Verena; Jones, James Parks; Shepherdson, John Cedric (1982). "Some Diophantine Forms of Gödel's Theorem". Archiv für Mathematische Logik. 22.
- Huber-Dyson, Verena (1982). "Decision Problems in Group Theory". Recent Trends in Mathematics, Reinhardsbrunn 1982. Teubner Texte zur Mathematik. Vol. 50.
- Huber-Dyson, Verena (1984). "HNN-constructing Finite Groups". Groups Korea 1983. Springer Lecture Notes in Mathematics. Vol. 1098.
- Huber-Dyson, Verena (1981). "Critical Notice on Gödel, Escher, Bach by D.R. Hofstadter". Canadian Journal of Philosophy. 11 (4).
- Huber-Dyson, Verena (1996). "Thoughts on the Occasion of Kreisel's 70th Birthday". In Odifreddi (ed.). Kreiseliana, about and around George Kreisel. AK Peters.
- Huber-Dyson, Verena (June 1996a). "Shrieks and Shadows Over the Notices" (PDF). Notices of the AMS. 43 (6): 653.
- Huber-Dyson, Verena (15 February 1998). "On The Nature Of Mathematical Concepts: Why And How Do Mathematicians Jump To Conclusions?". Edge.org.
- Huber-Dyson, Verena (27 July 2005). "Gödel And The Nature Of Mathematical Truth II". Edge.org.
- Huber-Dyson, Verena (13 May 2006). "Gödel in a Nutshell". edge.org.
