= Fay's trisecant identity =

Identity between theta functions of Riemann surfaces

In algebraic geometry, Fay's trisecant identity is an identity between theta functions of Riemann surfaces introduced by John Fay. Fay's identity holds for theta functions of Jacobians of curves, but not for theta functions of general abelian varieties.

The name "trisecant identity" refers to the geometric interpretation given by David Mumford, who used it to show that the Kummer variety of a genus $g$ Riemann surface, given by the image of the map from the Jacobian to projective space of dimension $2^g-1$ induced by theta functions of order 2, has a 4-dimensional space of trisecants.

== Statement ==
Suppose that

- $C$ is a compact Riemann surface,
- $g$ is the genus of $C$,
- $\theta:\C^g\to \C$ is the Riemann theta function of $C$,
- $E$ is a prime form on $C\times C$,
- $u$, $v$, $x$, $y$ are points of $C$,
- $z$ is an element of $\mathbb{C}^g$, and
- $\omega$ is a 1-form on $C$ with values in $\mathbb{C}^g$.

Then Fay's identity states that

$$\begin{align}
E(x,v)E(u,y) \theta \bigg(z+\int_u^x\omega\bigg) \theta\bigg(z+\int_v^y\omega\bigg) &- E(x,u)E(v,y) \theta \bigg(z+\int_v^x\omega\bigg)\theta \bigg(z+\int_u^y\omega\bigg)\\[5pt] &= E(x,y)E(u,v)\theta(z)\theta\bigg(z+\int_{u+v}^{x+y}\omega\bigg)
\end{align}$$

with

$\int_{u+v}^{x+y}\omega=\int_u^x\omega+\int_v^y\omega=\int_u^y\omega+\int_v^x\omega.$
