= Heinrich Jung =

German mathematician (1876–1953)

Heinrich Wilhelm Ewald Jung (4 May 1876, Essen – 12 March 1953, Halle (Saale)) was a German mathematician, who specialized in geometry and algebraic geometry.

== Biography ==
Heinrich Jung was born as the son of a Bergrat (a mining officer of high rank) in Essen and studied from 1895 to 1899 mathematics, physics, and chemistry in Marburg/Lahn and Berlin under outstanding professors including Friedrich Schottky, Kurt Hensel, Lazarus Immanuel Fuchs, Hermann Amandus Schwarz, Ferdinand Georg Frobenius, and Max Planck. In his 1899 doctoral dissertation Über die kleinste Kugel, die eine räumliche Figur einschließt (About the smallest sphere enclosing a spatial figure) under Schottky he proved the eponymous Jung's Theorem. In 1902 he completed his Habilitation thesis in Marburg and remained there until 1908 as a privatdocent. Afterwards he was a Studienrat (teacher at a secondary school, i.e., Gymnasium) in Hamburg, before he became in 1913 a professor ordinarius in Kiel. After brief military service in World War I he became in 1918 a professor in Dorpat and in 1920 the successor to Albert Wangerin (1844–1933) at the University of Halle, where he remained until his retirement as professor emeritus in 1948. In Halle he was not only a professor but also one of the directors of mathematical seminars and dean of the mathematical and sciences faculty and until 1951 he continued to give lectures. He was a member of the Deutsche Akademie der Naturforscher Leopoldina.

Jung developed with his teacher Schottky a general theory of theta functions. Jung's fame derives mainly from his arithmetic theory of algebraic functions in two variables. His original research in this theory is gathered together in his book Einführung in die Theorie der algebraischen Funktionen zweier Veränderlicher. He also applied his theory to algebraic surfaces (with a presentation of this research in his book Algebraische Flächen) and worked on birational transformations in the plane (Cremona transformations).

During the Weimar Republic, Jung was a member of the anti-republican Alldeutschen Verband and also Der Stahlhelm. In the Nazi era, Jung was a member of the Nationalsozialistischen Volkswohlfahrt (NSV), the Nationalsozialistischer Deutscher Dozentenbund (NSDDB), and the Nationalsozialistischer Altherrenbund. In 1945 he represented the CDU.

== Works ==
- "Einführung in die Theorie der algebraischen Funktionen zweier Veränderlicher“, Berlin, Akademie Verlag, 1951
- "Algebraische Flächen“, Hannover, Helwingsche Verlagsbuchhandlung, 1925
- "Einführung in die Theorie der algebraischen Funktionen einer Veränderlichen", Berlin, Walter de Gruyter, 1923

== Sources ==
- Ott-Heinrich Keller and Wolfgang Engel: Heinrich Wilhelm Ewald Jung in Wiss. Z. Martin-Luther-Universität Halle 4, Heft 3, 1955, pp. 417–422; Jahresbericht DMV 58, 1955, pp. 5–10

== See also ==
- Jung's theorem
