= Prym variety =

In mathematics, the Prym variety construction (named for Friedrich Prym) is a method in algebraic geometry of making an abelian variety from a morphism of algebraic curves. In its original form, it was applied to an unramified double covering of a Riemann surface, and was used by F. Schottky and H. W. E. Jung in relation with the Schottky problem, as it is now called, of characterising Jacobian varieties among abelian varieties. It is said to have appeared first in the late work of Riemann, and was extensively studied by Wirtinger in 1895, including degenerate cases.

Given a non-constant morphism

φ: C_{1} → C_{2}

of algebraic curves, write J_{i} for the Jacobian variety of C_{i}. Then from φ construct the corresponding morphism

ψ: J_{1} → J_{2},

which can be defined on a divisor class D of degree zero by applying φ to each point of the divisor. This is a well-defined morphism, often called the norm homomorphism. Then the Prym variety of φ is the kernel of ψ. To qualify that somewhat, to get an abelian variety, the connected component of the identity of the reduced scheme underlying the kernel may be intended. Or in other words take the largest abelian subvariety of J_{1} on which ψ is trivial.

The theory of Prym varieties was dormant for a long time, until revived by David Mumford around 1970. It now plays a substantial role in some contemporary theories, for example of the Kadomtsev–Petviashvili equation. One advantage of the method is that it allows one to apply the theory of curves to the study of a wider class of abelian varieties than Jacobians. For example, principally polarized abelian varieties (p.p.a.v.'s) of dimension > 3 are not generally Jacobians, but all p.p.a.v.'s of dimension 5 or less are Prym varieties. It is for this reason that p.p.a.v.'s are fairly well understood up to dimension 5.
