= Brauer tree =

In mathematics, in the theory of finite groups, a Brauer tree is a tree that encodes the characters of a block with cyclic defect group of a finite group. In fact, the trees encode the group algebra up to Morita equivalence. Such algebras coming from Brauer trees are called Brauer tree algebras.

Feit (1984) described the possibilities for Brauer trees.
