= Walter Schnee =

German mathematician (1885–1958)

Walter Schnee (8 August 1885 – 10 June 1958) was a German mathematician.

== Biography ==
Schnee was born on 8 August 1885 in Rawicz. From 1904 to 1908, he studied mathematics in Berlin. From 1909 to 1917, he worked at the University of Breslau. He then went to the University of Leipzig, where he stayed until 1954. He worked in the field of number theory. He died on 10 June 1958 in Leipzig.
