= List of partition topics =

Generally, a partition is a division of a whole into non-overlapping parts. Among the kinds of partitions considered in mathematics are

- partition of a set or an ordered partition of a set,
- partition of a graph,
- partition of an integer,
- partition of an interval,
- partition of unity,
- partition of a matrix; see block matrix, and
- partition of the sum of squares in statistics problems, especially in the analysis of variance,
- quotition and partition, two ways of viewing the operation of division of integers.

== Integer partitions ==
- Composition (combinatorics)
- Core partition
- Ewens's sampling formula
- Ferrers graph
  - Young tableau
- Glaisher's theorem
- Landau's function
- Multipartition
- Multiplicative partition
- Partition function (number theory)
- Pentagonal number theorem
- Plane partition
  - Solid partition
- Quotition and partition
- Rank of a partition
  - Crank of a partition
- Young's lattice

== Set partitions ==
- Bell number
- Bell polynomials
  - Dobinski's formula
- Cumulant
- Data clustering
- Equivalence relation
- Exact cover
  - Knuth's Algorithm X
    - Dancing Links
- Exponential formula
- Faà di Bruno's formula
- Feshbach–Fano partitioning
- Foliation
- Frequency partition
- Graph partition
- Kernel of a function
- Lamination (topology)
- Matroid partitioning
- Noncrossing partition
- Ordered partition of a set
- Partition calculus
- Partition function (quantum field theory)
- Partition function (statistical mechanics)
- Partition of an interval
- Partition of a set
  - Ordered partition
  - Partition refinement
  - Disjoint-set data structure
- Partition problem
  - 3-partition problem
- Partition topology
- Quotition and partition
- Recursive partitioning
- Stirling number
  - Stirling transform
- Stratification (mathematics)
- Tverberg partition
- Twelvefold way

=== In probability and stochastic processes ===
- Chinese restaurant process
- Dobinski's formula
- Ewens's sampling formula
- Law of total cumulance
