= Frank Garvan =

Australian-born mathematician (born 1955)

Francis G. Garvan (born March 9, 1955) is an Australian-born mathematician who specializes in number theory and combinatorics. He holds the position Professor of Mathematics at the University of Florida. He received his Ph.D. from Pennsylvania State University (January, 1986) with George E. Andrews as his thesis advisor. Garvan's thesis, Generalizations of Dyson's rank, concerned the rank of a partition and formed the groundwork for several of his later papers.

Garvan is well-known for his work in the fields of q-series and integer partitions. Most famously, in 1988, Garvan and Andrews discovered a definition of the crank of a partition. The crank of a partition is an elusive combinatorial statistic similar to the rank of a partition which provides a key to the study of Ramanujan congruences in partition theory. It was first described by Freeman Dyson in a paper on ranks for the journal Eureka in 1944. Andrews and Garvan's definition was the first definition of a crank to satisfy the properties hypothesized for it in Dyson's paper.
