= SPT =

SPT may refer to:

== Organisations ==
- Society for Philosophy and Technology
- Strathclyde Partnership for Transport, Scotland
- Sunpentown, a Taiwanese appliance manufacturer

== Science and technology ==
- Septic pelvic thrombophlebitis, a postpartum complication
- Serine C-palmitoyltransferase, an enzyme catalyst
- Shortest processing time in single machine scheduling
- Single-particle tracking within a medium
- Skin prick test, in diagnosis of allergies
- South Pole Telescope
- Standard penetration test, used to measure soil properties
- Stationary Plasma Thruster, a type of ion engine ion for spacecraft
- Symmetry-protected topological order, in zero-temperature matter
- Social penetration theory, a proposed theory of relationship development

=== Mathematics ===
- Shortest-path tree, a type of graph
- Spt function or smallest parts function, related to partition function

== Railway stations ==
- Sandpoint station, Idaho, United States
- Spotswood railway station, Melbourne, Australia
- Springhurst railway station, Australia
- Stockport railway station, United Kingdom

== Other uses ==
- Stochastic portfolio theory
- Super Powered Tracer, in anime Blue Comet SPT Layzner
- Substantial Presence Test, US criterion for residency
- Sony Pictures Television, TV production and distribution arm of Sony Pictures Entertainment
