= Core partition =

Concept in combinatorics

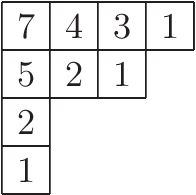
A 6-core partition, with the hook length of each cell labelled.

In combinatorial mathematics, a t-core partition is a partition which has no hooks of length t. Such partitions have been used in the study of Ramanujan's congruences on the partition function and for representation theory of the symmetric group, especially modular representation theory.

== Definition ==
A partition $\lambda=(\lambda_1,\dots,\lambda_k)$ is a weakly decreasing list of positive integers, which we associate with its Young diagram by drawing $\lambda_i$ square cells in row i of an array. The size of a partition, denoted $|\lambda|$, is the sum of all $\lambda_i$, or the total number of cells. The conjugate partition $\lambda'$ is the partition whose values are the length of each column in $\lambda$.

The cells in the diagram are labelled by $(i,j)$ for $1\leq i\leq k$ and $1\leq j\leq \lambda_i$. The hook length $h_\lambda(i,j)$ of cell $(i, j)$ is given by
$$h_\lambda(i,j)=\lambda_i+\lambda_j'-i-j+1,$$
which is equal to the number of cells in the rotated L-shaped hook with vertex at $(i,j)$ which extends to the right and downwards.

For a positive integer t, a partition is t-core if it has no cells with a hook length of t.

== Properties ==
If a partition is t-core, then it is also (nt)-core for every positive integer n.

In any row/column of a t-core partition which contains a cell of hook length h > t, there is a cell in the same row/column with hook length h – t.

The only 1-core partition is the empty partition with no cells. The 2-core partitions are the staircase partitions $\lambda=(k,\dots,2,1)$. If $\rho$ is the perimeter of the Young diagram of a partition, then this partition is t-core for every $t\geq\rho/2$.

Number of t-core partitions of size n.
n t	1	2	3	4	5	6
1	0	0	0	0	0	0
2	1	0	1	0	0	1
3	1	2	0	2	1	2
4	1	2	3	1	3	3
5	1	2	3	5	2	6
6	1	2	3	5	7	5

For every integer t at least 4, there exists a t-core partition of size n for every positive integer n. This result was known as the t-core conjecture before finally being proven by Andrew Granville and Ken Ono in 1996.

If $c_t(n)$ is the number of t-core partitions of size n, we have the generating function
$$\sum_{n=0}^\infty c_t(n)q^n=\frac{\phi\left(q^t\right)^t}{\phi(q)}$$
where $\phi(q)=(1-q) \left(1-q^2\right) \left(1-q^3\right)\cdots$ is the Euler function. Note that $1/\phi(q)$ is the generating function for all partitions.

== Abacus ==
The generating function for t-core partitions implies that there is a bijection between partitions $\lambda$ and pairs $\left(\lambda^{(t)},\Lambda_{(t)}\right)$, where $\lambda^{(t)}$ is a t-core partition and $\Lambda_{(t)}= \left(\lambda_{(1)},\dots,\lambda_{(t-1)}\right)$ is a sequence of partitions such that
$$|\lambda|= \left|\lambda^{(t)}\right|+t \left(\left|\lambda_{(0)}\right|+\cdots+\left|\lambda_{(t-1)}\right|\right).$$
We call $\lambda^{(t)}$ the t-core of $\lambda$ and $\Lambda^{(t)}$ the t-quotient of $\lambda$.

=== Construction ===
We give a construction of this bijection using an abacus. For a partition $\lambda$, define the infinite set $\beta^\lambda=\{\lambda_i-i\mid i\geq 1\}$ where $\lambda_i=0$ for every $i>k$. Given the set $\beta$, we can recover $\lambda$ as follows: shift all entries of $\beta$ so that 0 is the smallest number which doesn't appear. Then the positive entries of this shifted set are the hook lengths of the first column of $\lambda$.

Consider an abacus with t infinitely long vertical runners numbered 0, 1, up to t – 1. Label the position on runner $r$ at height $s$ by $st+r$, so values increase left-to-right then bottom-to-top.

Given a partition $\lambda$, place beads on the abacus at each position in $\beta^\lambda$. If $\beta_{(r)}$ are the heights of the beads on runner $r$, then $\lambda_{(r)}$ is the unique partition with $\beta^{\lambda_{(r)}}=\beta_{(r)}$. Next, suppose $\beta'$ are the positions of the beads when the beads in $\beta^\lambda$ naturally fall under gravity. Then $\lambda^{(t)}$ is the unique partition satisfying $\beta^{\lambda^{(t)}}=\beta'$.

=== Example ===
Suppose $\lambda=(11,6,6,3,3,2,1,1)$ and $t=4$. Then
$$\beta^\lambda=\{10,4,3,-1,-2,-4,-6,-7,-9,-10,-11,\dots\}$$

We draw our 4-abacus by circling the beads in $\beta^\lambda$.

Looking at runner 0 (the first column), the shaded beads have heights $\beta_{(0)}=\{1,-1,-3,-4,-5,\dots\}$. Hence, the first-column hook lengths of $\lambda_{(1)}$ are $\{3,1\}$, and so $\lambda_{(0)}=(2,1).$

In runner 1, we have $\beta_{(1)}=\{-2,-3,\dots\}$ and so $\lambda_{(1)}$ is the empty partition $()$. We have $\beta_{(2)}=\{2,-1,-2,\dots\}$ so $\lambda_{(2)}=(2)$, and finally $\lambda_{(3)}=(1,1)$. These partitions make up the 4-quotient $\Lambda^{(4)}$.

Now we calculate the 4-core of $\lambda$. Letting the beads of $\beta^\lambda$ fall under gravity gives the abacus:

Therefore,
$$\beta'=\{2,-1,-2,-4,-5,-6,\dots\}.$$
The smallest missing value is –3, so shifting the values by 3 gives the first-column hook lengths $\{5,2,1\}$ which means $\lambda^{(4)}=(3,1,1)$, which is indeed a 4-core partition.

== Other identities ==
Ramanujan's modular equations can be used to prove identities for $c_t(n)$, such as $c_3(4n+1)=c_3(n)$ and $c_5(4n+3)=c_5(2n+1)+2c_5(n)$.

Partitions which are simultaneously t-core for multiple values of t are well-studied. For example, if s and t are coprime positive integers, then the number of partitions which are simultaneously s-core and t-core is equal to
$$\frac{1}{s+t}\binom{s+t}{s},$$
which is a rational Catalan number.

The number of t-core partitions with at most k rows is equal to the number of partitions with at most k rows and at most t – 1 columns. A bijection between these sets is given by $\lambda\mapsto \partial$, where $\partial_i$ is the number of cells in row $i$ of $\lambda$ whose hook length is less than t.

== See also ==
- Hook length formula
- Representation theory of the symmetric group
- Crank of a partition
