= The Archimedeans =

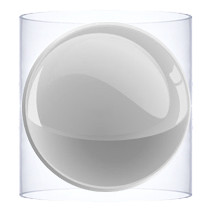
- Named after: Archimedes
- Formation: 1935
- Type: Student Society
- Location: Cambridge, England
- President: Rohan Galappathie
- External Secretary: Maksym Chaplanov
- Sponsorship Officer: Ronak De
- Parent organization: University of Cambridge
- Website: archim.org.uk

The Archimedeans are the mathematical society of the University of Cambridge, founded in 1935. It currently has over 2000 active members, many of them alumni, making it one of the largest student societies in Cambridge. The society hosts regular talks at the Centre for Mathematical Sciences, including in the past by many well-known speakers in the field of mathematics. It publishes two magazines, Eureka and QARCH.

One of several aims of the society, as laid down in its constitution, is to encourage co-operation between the existing mathematical societies of individual Cambridge colleges, which at present are just the Adams Society of St John's College, Emmanuel Mathematical Society, the Hyperbolics (St Catherine's College), Queens' College Mathematics Society and the Trinity Mathematical Society, but in the past have included many more.

The society is mentioned in G. H. Hardy's essay A Mathematician's Apology.

Past presidents of The Archimedeans include Michael Atiyah and Richard Taylor.

== Activity ==
The main focus of the society's activities are the regular talks, which generally concern topics from mathematics or theoretical physics, and are accessible to students on an undergraduate level. Among the list of recent speakers are Fields medalists Michael Atiyah, Wendelin Werner and Alain Connes, as well as authors Ian Stewart and Simon Singh. Many of the speakers are international, and are hosted by The Archimedeans during their visit.

After exams and University-wide project deadlines, the society is also known to organise social events.

== Publications ==
Eureka is a mathematical journal that is published annually by The Archimedeans. It includes articles on a variety of topics in mathematics, written by students and academics from all over the world, as well as a short summary of the activities of the society, problem sets, puzzles, artwork and book reviews. The magazine has been published 65 times since 1939, and authors include many famous mathematicians and scientists such as Paul Erdős, Martin Gardner, Douglas Hofstadter, Godfrey Hardy, Béla Bollobás, John Conway, Stephen Hawking, Roger Penrose, Ian Stewart, Chris Budd, Fields Medallist Timothy Gowers and Nobel laureate Paul Dirac.

The Archimedeans also publish QARCH, a magazine containing problem sets and solutions or partial solutions submitted by readers. It is published on an irregular basis and distributed free of charge.

== Sponsorship ==
The Archimedeans has developed a sponsorship programme with companies in the financial and technology sectors. The society's sponsors have included Jane Street, Optiver, Citadel, Hudson River Trading, Five Rings, Jump Trading, DRW, Qube Research & Technologies, Balyasny Asset Management, Susquehanna International Group, Da Vinci Trading, Rokos Capital Management, Quadrature Capital, Canopy Labs, Gondor Capital and DV Trading. The programme supports the society's activities and provides sponsors with opportunities to advertise to its membership and participate in events at the University of Cambridge.

In recent years, the society has expanded its sponsorship programme to include a wider range of quantitative trading, investment management and technology firms thanks to the new sponsorship officer, Ronak. Sponsored activities have included talks, workshops, trading games and other events for students.
