= Spt function =

The spt function (smallest parts function) is a function in number theory that counts the sum of the number of smallest parts in each integer partition of a positive integer. It is related to the partition function.

The first few values of spt(n) are:

1, 3, 5, 10, 14, 26, 35, 57, 80, 119, 161, 238, 315, 440, 589 ... (sequence A092269 in the OEIS)

== Example ==
For example, there are five partitions of 4 (with smallest parts underlined):

4
3 + 1
2 + 2
2 + 1 + 1
1 + 1 + 1 + 1

These partitions have 1, 1, 2, 2, and 4 smallest parts, respectively. So spt(4) = 1 + 1 + 2 + 2 + 4 = 10.

== Properties ==
Like the partition function, spt(n) has a generating function. It is given by

$$S(q)=\sum_{n=1}^{\infty} \mathrm{spt}(n) q^n=\frac{1}{(q)_{\infty}}\sum_{n=1}^{\infty} \frac{q^n \prod_{m=1}^{n-1}(1-q^m)}{1-q^n}$$

where $(q)_{\infty}=\prod_{n=1}^{\infty} (1-q^n)$.

The function $S(q)$ is related to a mock modular form. Let $E_2(z)$ denote the weight 2 quasi-modular Eisenstein series and let $\eta(z)$ denote the Dedekind eta function. Then for $q=e^{2\pi i z}$, the function

$$\tilde{S}(z):=q^{-1/24}S(q)-\frac{1}{12}\frac{E_2(z)}{\eta(z)}$$

is a mock modular form of weight 3/2 on the full modular group $SL_2(\mathbb{Z})$ with multiplier system $\chi_{\eta}^{-1}$, where $\chi_{\eta}$ is the multiplier system for $\eta(z)$.

While a closed formula is not known for spt(n), there are Ramanujan-like congruences including

$$\mathrm{spt}(5n+4) \equiv 0 \mod(5)$$
$$\mathrm{spt}(7n+5) \equiv 0 \mod(7)$$
$$\mathrm{spt}(13n+6) \equiv 0 \mod(13).$$
