= Differential poset =

In mathematics, a differential poset is a partially ordered set (or poset for short) satisfying certain local properties. (The formal definition is given below.) This family of posets was introduced by Stanley (1988) as a generalization of Young's lattice (the poset of integer partitions ordered by inclusion), many of whose combinatorial properties are shared by all differential posets. In addition to Young's lattice, the other most significant example of a differential poset is the Young–Fibonacci lattice.

== Definitions ==
A poset P is said to be a differential poset, and in particular to be r-differential (where r is a positive integer), if it satisfies the following conditions:

- P is graded and locally finite with a unique minimal element;
- for every two distinct elements x, y of P, the number of elements covering both x and y is the same as the number of elements covered by both x and y; and
- for every element x of P, the number of elements covering x is exactly r more than the number of elements covered by x.

These basic properties may be restated in various ways. For example, Stanley shows that the number of elements covering two distinct elements x and y of a differential poset is always either 0 or 1, so the second defining property could be altered accordingly.

The defining properties may also be restated in the following linear algebraic setting: taking the elements of the poset P to be formal basis vectors of an (infinite-dimensional) vector space, let D and U be the operators defined so that D x is equal to the sum of the elements covered by x, and U x is equal to the sum of the elements covering x. (The operators D and U are called the down and up operator, for obvious reasons.) Then the second and third conditions may be replaced by the statement that DU − UD = r I (where I is the identity).

This latter reformulation makes a differential poset into a combinatorial realization of a Weyl algebra, and in particular explains the name differential: the operators "d/dx" and "multiplication by x" on the vector space of polynomials obey the same commutation relation as D/r and U.

== Examples ==
The Young–Fibonacci graph, the Hasse diagram of the Young–Fibonacci lattice.

The canonical examples of differential posets are Young's lattice, the poset of integer partitions ordered by inclusion, and the Young–Fibonacci lattice. Stanley's initial paper established that Young's lattice is the only 1-differential distributive lattice, while Byrnes (2012) showed that these are the only 1-differential lattices.

There is a canonical construction (called "reflection") of a differential poset given a finite poset that obeys all of the defining axioms below its top rank. (The Young–Fibonacci lattice is the poset that arises by applying this construction beginning with a single point.) This can be used to show that there are infinitely many differential posets. Stanley (1988) includes a remark that "[David] Wagner described a very general method for constructing differential posets which make it unlikely that [they can be classified]." This is made precise in Lewis (2007), where it is shown that there are uncountably many 1-differential posets. On the other hand, explicit examples of differential posets are rare; Lewis (2007) gives a convoluted description of a differential poset other than the Young and Young–Fibonacci lattices.

The Young-Fibonacci lattice has a natural r-differential analogue for every positive integer r. These posets are lattices, and can be constructed by a variation of the reflection construction. In addition, the product of an r-differential and s-differential poset is always an (r + s)-differential poset. This construction also preserves the lattice property. It is not known for any r > 1 whether there are any r-differential lattices other than those that arise by taking products of the Young–Fibonacci lattices and Young's lattice.

Unsolved problem in mathematics
Are there any differential lattices that are not products of Young's lattice and the Young–Fibonacci lattices?
More unsolved problems in mathematics

== Rank growth ==
In addition to the question of whether there are other differential lattices, there are several long-standing open problems relating to the rank growth of differential posets. It was conjectured in Stanley (1988) that if P is a differential poset with r_{n} vertices at rank n, then

$$p(n) \le r_n \le F_n,$$

where p(n) is the number of integer partitions of n and F_{n} is the nth Fibonacci number. In other words, the conjecture states that at every rank, every differential poset has a number of vertices lying between the numbers for Young's lattice and the Young-Fibonacci lattice. The upper bound was proved in Byrnes (2012), while the lower bound remains open. Stanley & Zanello (2012) proved an asymptotic version of the lower bound, showing that

$$r_n \gg n^a \exp(2\sqrt{n})$$

for every differential poset and some constant a. By comparison, the partition function has asymptotics

$$p(n) \sim \frac{1}{4n\sqrt{3}} \exp\left({\pi \sqrt {\frac{2n}{3}}}\right).$$

All known bounds on rank sizes of differential posets are quickly growing functions. In the original paper of Stanley, it was shown (using eigenvalues of the operator DU) that the rank sizes are weakly increasing. However, it took 25 years before Miller (2013) showed that the rank sizes of an r-differential poset strictly increase (except trivially between ranks 0 and 1 when r = 1).

== Properties ==
A Hasse diagram of Young's lattice

Every 1-differential poset P enjoys a large number of combinatorial properties. A few of these include:

- The number of paths of length 2n in the Hasse diagram of P beginning and ending at the minimal element is (2n − 1)!!, where m!! is the double factorial function. In an r-differential poset, the number of such paths is (2n − 1)!! r^{n}.
- The number of paths of length 2n in the Hasse diagram of P beginning with the minimal element such that the first n steps are covering relations from a smaller to a larger element of P while the last n steps are covering relations from a larger to a smaller element of P is n!. In an r-differential poset, the number is n! r^{n}.
- The number of upward paths of length n in the Hasse diagram of P beginning with the minimal element is equal to the number of involutions in the symmetric group on n letters. In an r-differential poset, the sequence of these numbers has exponential generating function e^{rx + x^{2}/2}.

== Generalizations ==
In a differential poset, the same set of edges is used to compute the up and down operators U and D. If one permits different sets of up edges and down edges (sharing the same vertex sets, and satisfying the same relation), the resulting concept is the dual graded graph, initially defined by Fomin (1994). One recovers differential posets as the case that the two sets of edges coincide.

Much of the interest in differential posets is inspired by their connections to representation theory. The elements of Young's lattice are integer partitions, which encode the representations of the symmetric groups, and are connected to the ring of symmetric functions; Okada (1994) defined algebras whose representation is encoded instead by the Young–Fibonacci lattice, and allow for analogous constructions such as a Fibonacci version of symmetric functions. It is not known whether similar algebras exist for every differential poset. In another direction, Lam & Shimozono (2007) defined dual graded graphs corresponding to any Kac–Moody algebra.

Other variations are possible; Stanley (1990) defined versions in which the number r in the definition varies from rank to rank, while Lam (2008) defined a signed analogue of differential posets in which cover relations may be assigned a "weight" of −1.

== Sources ==
- Stanley, Richard (2011), Enumerative Combinatorics (PDF), vol. 1 (2 ed.), archived from the original (PDF) on 2011-05-31
- Byrnes, Patrick (2012), Structural Aspects of Differential Posets, ISBN 9781267855169
- Fomin, Sergey (1994), "Duality of graded graphs", Journal of Algebraic Combinatorics, 3 (4): 357–404, doi:10.1023/A:1022412010826
- Lam, Thomas F. (2008), "Signed differential posets and sign-imbalance", Journal of Combinatorial Theory, Series A, 115 (3): 466–484, arXiv:math/0611296, doi:10.1016/j.jcta.2007.07.003, S2CID 10802016
- Lam, Thomas F.; Shimozono, Mark (2007), "Dual graded graphs for Kac-Moody algebras", Algebra & Number Theory, 1 (4): 451–488, arXiv:math/0702090, doi:10.2140/ant.2007.1.451, S2CID 18253442
- Lewis, Joel Brewster (2007), On Differential Posets (PDF) (Harvard College undergraduate thesis)
- Miller, Alexander (2013), "Differential posets have strict rank growth: a conjecture of Stanley", Order, 30 (2): 657–662, arXiv:1202.3006, doi:10.1007/s11083-012-9268-y, S2CID 38737147
- Okada, Soichi (1994), "Algebras associated to the Young-Fibonacci lattice", Transactions of the American Mathematical Society, 346 (2), American Mathematical Society: 549–568, doi:10.2307/2154860, JSTOR 2154860
- Stanley, Richard P. (1988), "Differential posets", Journal of the American Mathematical Society, 1 (4), American Mathematical Society: 919–961, doi:10.2307/1990995, JSTOR 1990995
- Stanley, Richard P. (1990), "Variations on differential posets", Invariant theory and tableaux (Minneapolis, MN), 1988, IMA Vol. Math. Appl., vol. 19, Springer, pp. 145–165
- Stanley, Richard P.; Zanello, Fabrizio (2012), "On the Rank Function of a Differential Poset", Electronic Journal of Combinatorics, 19 (2): P13, arXiv:1111.4371, doi:10.37236/2258, S2CID 7405057
