= Multipartition =

In number theory and combinatorics, a multipartition of a positive integer n is a way of writing n as a sum, each element of which is in turn an integer partition. The concept is also found in the theory of Lie algebras.

== r-component multipartitions ==
An r-component multipartition of an integer n is an r-tuple of partitions λ^{(1)}, ..., λ^{(r)} where each λ^{(i)} is a partition of some a_{i} and the a_{i} sum to n. The number of r-component multipartitions of n is denoted P_{r}(n). Congruences for the function P_{r}(n) have been studied by A. O. L. Atkin.
