= Young's lattice =

Lattice formed by all integer partitions

A Hasse diagram of Young's lattice

In mathematics, Young's lattice is a lattice that is formed by all integer partitions. It is named after Alfred Young, who, in a series of papers On quantitative substitutional analysis, developed the representation theory of the symmetric group. In Young's theory, the objects now called Young diagrams and the partial order on them played a key, even decisive, role. Young's lattice prominently figures in algebraic combinatorics, forming the simplest example of a differential poset in the sense of Stanley (1988). It is also closely connected with the crystal bases for affine Lie algebras.

== Definition ==
Young's lattice is a lattice (and hence also a partially ordered set) Y formed by all integer partitions ordered by inclusion of their Young diagrams (or Ferrers diagrams).

== Significance ==
The traditional application of Young's lattice is to the description of the irreducible representations of symmetric groups S_{n} for all n, together with their branching properties, in characteristic zero. The equivalence classes of irreducible representations may be parametrized by partitions or Young diagrams, the restriction from S_{n+1} to S_{n} is multiplicity-free, and the representation of S_{n} with partition p is contained in the representation of S_{n+1} with partition q if and only if q covers p in Young's lattice. Iterating this procedure, one arrives at Young's semicanonical basis in the irreducible representation of S_{n} with partition p, which is indexed by the standard Young tableaux of shape p.

== Properties ==
- The poset Y is graded: the minimal element is ∅, the unique partition of zero, and the partitions of n have rank n. This means that given two partitions that are comparable in the lattice, their ranks are ordered in the same sense as the partitions, and there is at least one intermediate partition of each intermediate rank.
- The poset Y is a lattice. The meet and join of two partitions are given by the intersection and the union of the corresponding Young diagrams. Because it is a lattice in which the meet and join operations are represented by intersections and unions, it is a distributive lattice.
- If a partition p covers k elements of Young's lattice for some k then it is covered by k + 1 elements. All partitions covered by p can be found by removing one of the "corners" of its Young diagram (boxes at the end both of their row and of their column). All partitions covering p can be found by adding one of the "dual corners" to its Young diagram (boxes outside the diagram that are the first such box both in their row and in their column). There is always a dual corner in the first row, and for each other dual corner there is a corner in the previous row, whence the stated property.
- If distinct partitions p and q both cover k elements of Y then k is 0 or 1, and p and q are covered by k elements. In plain language: two partitions can have at most one (third) partition covered by both (their respective diagrams then each have one box not belonging to the other), in which case there is also one (fourth) partition covering them both (whose diagram is the union of their diagrams).
- Saturated chains between ∅ and p are in a natural bijection with the standard Young tableaux of shape p: the diagrams in the chain add the boxes of the diagram of the standard Young tableau in the order of their numbering. More generally, saturated chains between q and p are in a natural bijection with the skew standard tableaux of skew shape p/q.
- The Möbius function of Young's lattice takes values 0, ±1. It is given by the formula

$$\mu(q,p) = \begin{cases}
(-1)^{|p| - |q|} & \text{if the skew diagram }p/q\text{ is a disconnected union of squares} \\
& \text{(no common edges);} \\[10pt]
0 & \text{otherwise}. \end{cases}$$

== Dihedral symmetry ==
The portion of Young's lattice lying below 1 + 1 + 1 + 1, 2 + 2 + 2, 3 + 3, and 4

Conventional diagram with partitions of the same rank at the same height

Diagram showing dihedral symmetry

Conventionally, Young's lattice is depicted in a Hasse diagram with all elements of the same rank shown at the same height above the bottom. Suter (2002) has shown that a different way of depicting some subsets of Young's lattice shows some unexpected symmetries.

The partition

$$n + \cdots + 3 + 2 + 1$$

of the nth triangular number has a Ferrers diagram that looks like a staircase. The largest elements whose Ferrers diagrams are rectangular that lie under the staircase are these:

$$\begin{array}{c}
\underbrace{1 + \cdots\cdots\cdots + 1}_{n\text{ terms}} \\
\underbrace{2 + \cdots\cdots + 2}_{n-1\text{ terms}} \\
\underbrace{3 + \cdots + 3}_{n-2\text{ terms}} \\
\vdots \\
\underbrace{{}\quad  n\quad {}}_{1\text{ term}}
\end{array}$$

Partitions of this form are the only ones that have only one element immediately below them in Young's lattice. Suter showed that the set of all elements less than or equal to these particular partitions has not only the bilateral symmetry that one expects of Young's lattice, but also rotational symmetry: the rotation group of order n + 1 acts on this poset. Since this set has both bilateral symmetry and rotational symmetry, it must have dihedral symmetry: the (n + 1)st dihedral group acts faithfully on this set. The size of this set is 2^{n}.

For example, when n = 4, then the maximal elements under the "staircase" that have rectangular Ferrers diagrams are

1 + 1 + 1 + 1
2 + 2 + 2
3 + 3
4

The subset of Young's lattice lying below these partitions has both bilateral symmetry and 5-fold rotational symmetry. Hence the dihedral group D_{5} acts faithfully on this subset of Young's lattice.

== See also ==
- Young–Fibonacci lattice
- Bratteli diagram
