= Multiplicative partition =

Way to write a number as a product of other numbers

In number theory, a multiplicative partition or unordered factorization of an integer $n$ is a way of writing $n$ as a product of integers greater than 1, treating two products as equivalent if they differ only in the ordering of the factors. The number $n$ is itself considered one of these products. Multiplicative partitions closely parallel the study of multipartite partitions, which are additive partitions of finite sequences of positive integers, with the addition made pointwise. Although the study of multiplicative partitions has been ongoing since at least 1923, the name "multiplicative partition" appears to have been introduced by Hughes & Shallit (1983). The Latin name "factorisatio numerorum" had been used previously. MathWorld uses the term unordered factorization.

== Examples ==
- The number 20 has four multiplicative partitions: 2 × 2 × 5, 2 × 10, 4 × 5, and 20.
- 3 × 3 × 3 × 3, 3 × 3 × 9, 3 × 27, 9 × 9, and 81 are the five multiplicative partitions of 81 = 3^{4}. Because it is the fourth power of a prime, 81 has the same number (five) of multiplicative partitions as 4 does of additive partitions.
- The number 30 has five multiplicative partitions: 2 × 3 × 5 = 2 × 15 = 6 × 5 = 3 × 10 = 30.
- In general, the number of multiplicative partitions of a squarefree number with $i$ prime factors is the $i$th Bell number, $B_i$.

== Application ==
Hughes & Shallit (1983) describe an application of multiplicative partitions in classifying integers with a given number of divisors. For example, the integers with exactly 12 divisors take the forms $p^{11}$, $p\cdot q^5$, $p^2\cdot q^3$, and $p\cdot q\cdot r^2$, where $p$, $q$, and $r$ are distinct prime numbers; these forms correspond to the multiplicative partitions $12$, $2\cdot 6$, $3\cdot 4$, and $2\cdot 2\cdot 3$ respectively. More generally, for each multiplicative partition
$$k = \prod t_i$$
of the integer $k$, there corresponds a class of integers having exactly $k$ divisors, of the form

$$\prod p_i^{t_i-1},$$

where each $p_i$ is a distinct prime. This correspondence follows from the multiplicative property of the divisor function.

== Bounds on the number of partitions ==
Oppenheim (1926) credits MacMahon (1923) with the problem of counting the number of multiplicative partitions of $n$; this problem has since been studied by others under the Latin name of factorisatio numerorum. If the number of multiplicative partitions of $n$ is $a_n$, McMahon and Oppenheim observed that its Dirichlet series generating function $f(s)$ has the product representation
$$f(s)=\sum_{n=1}^{\infty}\frac{a_n}{n^s}=\prod_{k=2}^{\infty}\frac{1}{1-k^{-s}}.$$

The sequence of numbers $a_n$ begins

1, 1, 1, 2, 1, 2, 1, 3, 2, 2, 1, 4, 1, 2, 2, 5, 1, 4, 1, 4, 2, 2, 1, 7, 2, 2, 3, 4, 1, 5, 1, 7, 2, 2, 2, 9, 1, 2, 2, ... (sequence A001055 in the OEIS).

Oppenheim also claimed an upper bound on $a_n$, of the form
$$a_n\le n\left(\exp\frac{\log n\log\log\log n}{\log\log n}\right)^{-2+o(1)},$$
but as Canfield, Erdős & Pomerance (1983) showed, this bound is erroneous and the true bound is
$$a_n\le n\left(\exp\frac{\log n\log\log\log n}{\log\log n}\right)^{-1+o(1)}.$$

Both of these bounds are not far from linear in $n$: they are of the form $n^{1-o(1)}$. However, the typical value of $a_n$ is much smaller: the average value of $a_n$, averaged over an interval $x\le n\le x+N$, is
$$\bar a = \exp\left(\frac{4\sqrt{\log N}}{\sqrt{2e}\log\log N}\bigl(1+o(1)\bigr)\right),$$
a bound that is of the form $n^{o(1)}$.

== Additional results ==
Canfield, Erdős & Pomerance (1983) observe, and Luca, Mukhopadhyay & Srinivas (2010) prove, that most numbers cannot arise as the number $a_n$ of multiplicative partitions of some $n$: the number of values less than $N$ which arise in this way is $N^{O(\log\log\log N/\log\log N)}$. Additionally, Luca et al. show that most values of $n$ are not multiples of $a_n$: the number of values $n\le N$ such that $a_n$ divides $n$ is $O(N/\log^{1+o(1)} N)$.

== See also ==
- Divisor
- Partition (number theory)
