= Sunpentown =

Taiwanese appliance manufacturing company

Sunpentown (Chinese: 尚朋堂; pinyin: Shàngpéngtáng) is a Taiwanese appliance manufacturing company founded in Keelung, Taiwan in 1985 under the name Sunpentown Electric Company. The company specializes in manufacturing home and kitchen appliances. According to the website, the company's first domestic product was the induction cooker. It developed more kitchen-related appliances including Mr. Rice, a popular rice cooker. In 1993, the company expanded worldwide to areas such as China, Japan and the United States under the name Sunpentown International. Sunpentown International is headquartered in City of Industry, California.

By 1999, Sunpentown produced microcomputer-controlled rice cookers. In 2014, Sunpentown was involved in an energy consumption study involving home and commercial induction cookers. Sunpentown sells appliances under the SPT logo and brand.

Sunpentown manufactures household appliances such as humidifiers and air conditioners. In 2017, Engadget tested Sunpentown's SU-4010 and SU-9210 humidifier in a lineup with Honeywell's HCM-350 humidifier among others.
