= Eureka (University of Cambridge magazine) =

British mathematical journal

- Editor: Michael Grayling
- Categories: Mathematical Journal
- Frequency: sesquiannually
- Publisher: The Archimedeans
- First issue: 1939
- Company: University of Cambridge
- Country: United Kingdom
- Language: English
- Website: https://archim.soc.srcf.net/?page_id=140

Eureka is a journal published annually by The Archimedeans, the mathematical society of Cambridge University. It is one of the oldest recreational mathematics publications still in existence. Eureka includes many mathematical articles on a variety of different topics – written by students and mathematicians from all over the world – as well as a short summary of the activities of the society, problem sets, puzzles, artwork and book reviews.

Eureka has been published 66 times since 1939, and authors include many famous mathematicians and scientists such as Paul Erdős, Martin Gardner, Douglas Hofstadter, G. H. Hardy, Béla Bollobás, John Conway, Stephen Hawking, W. T. Tutte (writing with friends under the pseudonyms Blanche Descartes and F. de Carteblanche), popular maths writer Ian Stewart, Fields Medallist Timothy Gowers and Nobel laureates Paul Dirac and Roger Penrose.

The journal was formerly distributed free of charge to all current members of the Archimedeans. Today, it is published electronically as well as in print. In 2020, the publication archive was made freely available online.

Eureka is edited by students from the university.

Recent issues of Eureka
| Issue | Publication date | Editor |
|---|---|---|
| Eureka 67 | October 2024 | Chenyue (Linda) Zou, Saanya Verma and Christopher Hoeflein |
| Eureka 66 | October 2020 | Valentin Hübner |
| Eureka 65 | April 2018 | Michael Grayling |
| Eureka 64 | April 2016 | Long Tin Chan |
| Eureka 63 | September 2014 | Jasper Bird |
| Eureka 62 | December 2012 | Jack Williams and Philipp Legner |
| Eureka 61 | October 2011 | Philipp Legner and Anja Komatar |
| Eureka 60 | November 2010 | Philipp Legner |
| Eureka 59 | June 2008 | James West |
| Eureka 58 | September 2006 | Shu Kris Chen |
| Eureka 57 | May 2005 | Erica Thompson |
| Eureka 56 | March 2004 | Vicky Neale |
| Eureka 55 | June 2001 | Alan Bain |
| Eureka 54 | March 1996 | Alan Bain |
| Eureka 53 | February 1994 | Colin Bell |
| Eureka 52 | March 1993 | Michael T. Greene |
| Eureka 51 | March 1992 | Mark Wainwright |
| Eureka 50 | April 1990 | Mark Wainwright |

Of the mathematical articles, there is a paper by Freeman Dyson where he defined the rank of a partition in an effort to prove combinatorially the partition congruences earlier discovered by Srinivasa Ramanujan. In the article, Dyson made a series of conjectures that were all eventually resolved.
