= Rank of a partition =

Term in number theory and combinatorics

The rank of a partition, shown as its Young diagram

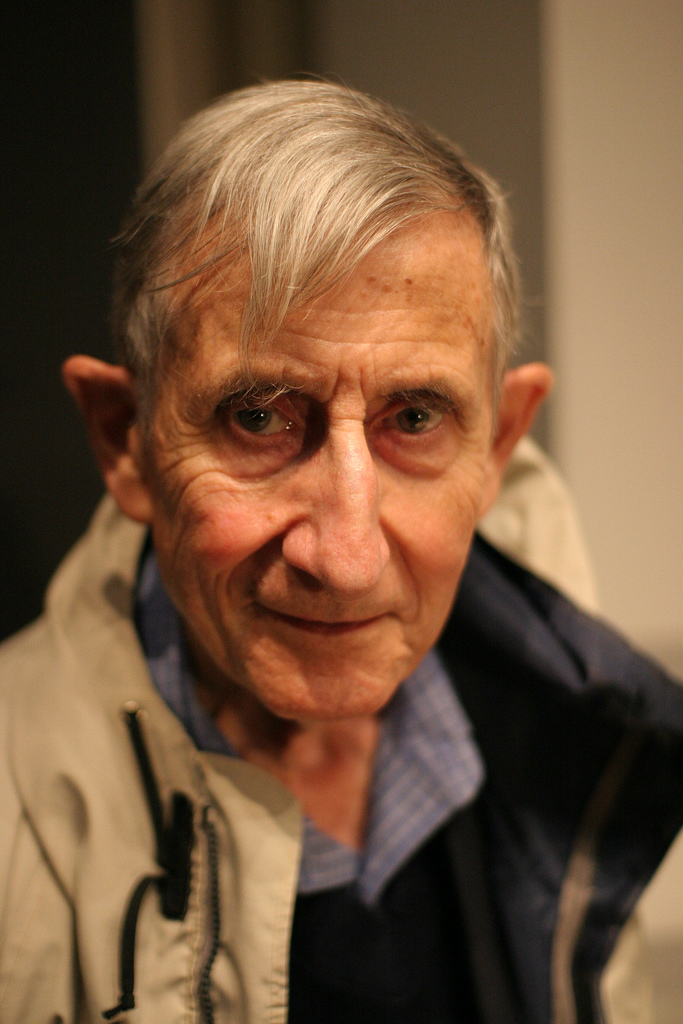
Freeman Dyson in 2005

In number theory and combinatorics, the rank of an integer partition is a certain number associated with the partition. In fact at least two different definitions of rank appear in the literature. The first definition, with which most of this article is concerned, is that the rank of a partition is the number obtained by subtracting the number of parts in the partition from the largest part in the partition. The concept was introduced by Freeman Dyson in a paper published in the journal Eureka. It was presented in the context of a study of certain congruence properties of the partition function discovered by the Indian mathematical genius Srinivasa Ramanujan. A different concept, sharing the same name, is used in combinatorics, where the rank is taken to be the size of the Durfee square of the partition.

== Definition ==
By a partition of a positive integer n we mean a finite multiset λ = { λ_{k}, λ_{k − 1}, . . . , λ_{1} } of positive integers satisfying the following two conditions:

- λ_{k} ≥ . . . ≥ λ_{2} ≥ λ_{1} > 0.
- λ_{k} + . . . + λ_{2} + λ_{1} = n.

If λ_{k}, . . . , λ_{2}, λ_{1} are distinct, that is, if

- λ_{k} > . . . > λ_{2} > λ_{1} > 0

then the partition λ is called a strict partition of n. The integers λ_{k}, λ_{k − 1}, ..., λ_{1} are the parts of the partition. The number of parts in the partition λ is k and the largest part in the partition is λ_{k}. The rank of the partition λ (whether ordinary or strict) is defined as λ_{k} − k.

The ranks of the partitions of n take the following values and no others:

n − 1, n −3, n −4, . . . , 2, 1, 0, −1, −2, . . . , −(n − 4), −(n − 3), −(n − 1).

The following table gives the ranks of the various partitions of the number 5.

Ranks of the partitions of the integer 5

Partition (λ)	Largest part (λ_{k})	Number of parts (k)	Rank of the partition (λ_{k} − k )
{ 5 }	5	1	4
{ 4, 1 }	4	2	2
{ 3, 2 }	3	2	1
{ 3, 1, 1 }	3	3	0
{ 2, 2, 1 }	2	3	−1
{ 2, 1, 1, 1 }	2	4	−2
{ 1, 1, 1, 1, 1 }	1	5	−4

== Notations ==
The following notations are used to specify how many partitions have a given rank. Let n, q be a positive integers and m be any integer.

- The total number of partitions of n is denoted by p(n).
- The number of partitions of n with rank m is denoted by N(m, n).
- The number of partitions of n with rank congruent to m modulo q is denoted by N(m, q, n).
- The number of strict partitions of n is denoted by Q(n).
- The number of strict partitions of n with rank m is denoted by R(m, n).
- The number of strict partitions of n with rank congruent to m modulo q is denoted by T(m, q, n).

For example,

p(5) = 7 , N(2, 5) = 1 , N(3, 5) = 0 , N(2, 2, 5) = 5 .
Q(5) = 3 , R(2, 5) = 1 , R(3, 5) = 0 , T(2, 2, 5) = 2.

== Some basic results ==
Let n, q be a positive integers and m be any integer.

- $N(m,n) = N(-m,n)$
- $N(m,q,n) = N(q-m,q,n)$
- $N(m,q,n) = \sum_{r=-\infty}^\infty N( m + rq, n)$

== Ramanujan's congruences and Dyson's conjecture ==
Srinivasa Ramanujan in a paper published in 1919 proved the following congruences involving the partition function p(n):

- p(5n + 4) ≡ 0 (mod 5)
- p(7n + 5) ≡ 0 (mod 7)
- p(11n + 6) ≡ 0 (mod 11)

In commenting on this result, Dyson noted that " . . . although we can prove that the partitions of 5n + 4 can be divided into five equally numerous subclasses, it is unsatisfactory to receive from the proofs no concrete idea of how the division is to be made. We require a proof which will not appeal to generating functions, . . . ". Dyson introduced the idea of rank of a partition to accomplish the task he set for himself. Using this new idea, he made the following conjectures:

- N(0, 5, 5n + 4) = N(1, 5, 5n + 4) = N(2, 5, 5n + 4) = N(3, 5, 5n + 4) = N(4, 5, 5n + 4)
- N(0, 7, 7n + 5) = N(1, 7, 7n + 5) = N(2, 7, 7n + 5) = . . . = N(6, 7, 7n + 5)

These conjectures were proved by Atkin and Swinnerton-Dyer in 1954.

The following tables show how the partitions of the integers 4 (5 × n + 4 with n = 0) and 9 (5 × n + 4 with n = 1 ) get divided into five equally numerous subclasses.

Partitions of the integer 4

Partitions with rank ≡ 0 (mod 5)	Partitions with rank ≡ 1 (mod 5)	Partitions with rank ≡ 2 (mod 5)	Partitions with rank ≡ 3 (mod 5)	Partitions with rank ≡ 4 (mod 5)
{ 2, 2 }	{ 3, 1 }	{ 1, 1, 1, 1 }	{ 4 }	{ 2, 1, 1 }

Partitions of the integer 9

Partitions with rank ≡ 0 (mod 5)	Partitions with rank ≡ 1 (mod 5)	Partitions with rank ≡ 2 (mod 5)	Partitions with rank ≡ 3 (mod 5)	Partitions with rank ≡ 4 (mod 5)
{ 7, 2 }	{ 8, 1 }	{ 6, 1, 1, 1 }	{ 9 }	{ 7, 1, 1 }
{ 5, 1, 1, 1, 1 }	{ 5, 2, 1, 1 }	{ 5, 3, 1}	{ 6, 2, 1 }	{ 6, 3 }
{ 4, 3, 1, 1 }	{ 4, 4, 1 }	{ 5, 2, 2 }	{ 5, 4 }	{ 4, 2, 1, 1, 1 }
{ 4, 2, 2, 1 }	{ 4, 3, 2 }	{ 3, 2, 1, 1, 1, 1 }	{ 3, 3, 1, 1, 1 }	{ 3, 3, 2, 1 }
{ 3, 3, 3 }	{ 3, 1, 1, 1, 1, 1, 1 }	{ 2, 2, 2, 2, 1 }	{ 4, 1, 1, 1, 1, 1 }	{ 3, 2, 2, 2 }
{ 2, 2, 1, 1, 1, 1, 1 }	{ 2, 2, 2, 1, 1, 1 }	{ 1, 1, 1, 1, 1, 1, 1, 1, 1 }	{ 3, 2, 2, 1, 1}	{ 2, 1, 1, 1, 1, 1, 1, 1 }

== Generating functions ==
The generating function
$$\sum_{n=0}^\infty p(n)x^n = \prod_{k=1}^\infty \frac{1}{1-x^k}$$
of p(n) was discovered by Leonhard Euler. The generating function for Q(n) is
$$\sum_{n=0}^\infty Q(n)x^n = \prod_{k=0}^\infty \frac{1}{1-x^{2k-1}}.$$
The generating functions for N(m, n) and R(m, n) are
$$\sum_{m=-\infty}^\infty \sum_{n=0}^\infty N(m,n) z^m q^n = 1 + \sum_{n=1}^\infty \frac{q^{n^2}}{\prod_{k=1}^n ( 1 - zq^k)(1-z^{-1}q^k)}$$
and
$$\sum_{m,n=0}^\infty R(m,n) z^m q^n = 1 + \sum_{s=1}^\infty \frac{q^{s(s+1)/2}}{(1-zq)(1-zq^2) \cdots (1-zq^s)},$$
respectively.

== Alternate definition ==
In combinatorics, the phrase rank of a partition is sometimes used to describe a different concept: the rank of a partition λ is the largest integer i such that λ has at least i parts each of which is no smaller than i. Equivalently, this is the length of the main diagonal in the Young diagram or Ferrers diagram for λ, or the side-length of the Durfee square of λ.

The table of ranks (under this alternate definition) of partitions of 5 is given below.

Ranks of the partitions of the integer 5

Partition	Rank
{ 5 }	1
{ 4, 1 }	1
{ 3, 2 }	2
{ 3, 1, 1 }	1
{ 2, 2, 1 }	2
{ 2, 1, 1, 1 }	1
{ 1, 1, 1, 1, 1 }	1

== See also ==
- Crank of a partition
