= Crank of a partition =

In number theory, the crank of an integer partition is a certain number associated with the partition. It was first introduced without a definition by Freeman Dyson, who hypothesised its existence in a 1944 paper. Dyson gave a list of properties this yet-to-be-defined quantity should have. In 1988, George E. Andrews and Frank Garvan discovered a definition for the crank satisfying the properties hypothesized for it by Dyson.

== Dyson's crank ==
Let n be a non-negative integer and let p(n) denote the number of partitions of n (p(0) is defined to be 1). Srinivasa Ramanujan in a paper published in 1918 stated and proved the following congruences for the partition function p(n), since known as Ramanujan congruences.

- p(5n + 4) ≡ 0 (mod 5)
- p(7n + 5) ≡ 0 (mod 7)
- p(11n + 6) ≡ 0 (mod 11)

These congruences imply that partitions of numbers of the form 5n + 4 (respectively, of the forms 7n + 5 and 11n + 6 ) can be divided into 5 (respectively, 7 and 11) subclasses of equal size. The then known proofs of these congruences were based on the ideas of generating functions and they did not specify a method for the division of the partitions into subclasses of equal size.

In his Eureka paper Dyson proposed the concept of the rank of a partition. The rank of a partition is the integer obtained by subtracting the number of parts in the partition from the largest part in the partition. For example, the rank of the partition λ = { 4, 2, 1, 1, 1 } of 9 is 4 − 5 = −1. Denoting by N(m, q, n), the number of partitions of n whose ranks are congruent to m modulo q, Dyson considered N(m, 5, 5 n + 4) and N(m, 7, 7n + 5) for various values of n and m. Based on empirical evidences Dyson formulated the following conjectures known as rank conjectures.

For all non-negative integers n we have:

- N(0, 5, 5n + 4) = N(1, 5, 5n + 4) = N(2, 5, 5n + 4) = N(3, 5, 5n + 4) = N(4, 5, 5n + 4).
- N(0, 7, 7n + 5) = N(1, 7, 7n + 5) = N(2, 7, 7n + 5) = N(3, 7, 7n + 5) = N(4, 7, 7n + 5) = N(5, 7, 7n + 5) = N(6, 7, 7n + 5)

Assuming that these conjectures are true, they provided a way of splitting up all partitions of numbers of the form 5n + 4 into five classes of equal size: Put in one class all those partitions whose ranks are congruent to each other modulo 5. The same idea can be applied to divide the partitions of integers of the form 7n + 5 into seven equally numerous classes. But the idea fails to divide partitions of integers of the form 11n + 6 into 11 classes of the same size, as the following table shows.

Partitions of the integer 6 ( 11n + 6 with n = 0 ) divided into classes based on ranks

rank ≡ 0 (mod 11)	rank ≡ 1 (mod 11)	rank ≡ 2 (mod 11)	rank ≡ 3 (mod 11)	rank ≡ 4 (mod 11)	rank ≡ 5 (mod 11)	rank ≡ 6 (mod 11)	rank ≡ 7 (mod 11)	rank ≡ 8 (mod 11)	rank ≡ 9 (mod 11)	rank ≡ 10 (mod 11)
{3,2,1}	{4,1,1}	{4,2}	{5,1}		{6}	{1,1,1,1,1,1}		{2,1,1,1,1}	{2,2,1,1}	{2,2,2}
	{3,3}									{3,1,1,1}

Thus the rank cannot be used to prove the theorem combinatorially. However, Dyson wrote,

I hold in fact :

- that there exists an arithmetical coefficient similar to, but more recondite than, the rank of a partition; I shall call this hypothetical coefficient the "crank" of the partition and denote by M(m, q, n) the number of partitions of n whose crank is congruent to m modulo q;
- that M(m, q, n) = M(q − m, q, n);
- that M(0, 11, 11n + 6) = M(1, 11, 11n + 6) = M(2, 11, 11n + 6) = M(3, 11, 11n + 6) = M(4, 11, 11n + 6);
- that . . .

Whether these guesses are warranted by evidence, I leave it to the reader to decide. Whatever the final verdict of posterity may be, I believe the "crank" is unique among arithmetical functions in having been named before it was discovered. May it be preserved from the ignominious fate of the planet Vulcan.

== Definition of crank ==
In a paper published in 1988 George E. Andrews and F. G. Garvan defined the crank of a partition as follows:

For a partition λ, let ℓ(λ) denote the largest part of λ, ω(λ) denote the number of 1's in λ, and μ(λ) denote the number of parts of λ larger than ω(λ). The crank c(λ) is given by

$$c(\lambda)=\begin{cases} \ell(\lambda) & \text{if } \omega(\lambda)=0 \\ \mu(\lambda)-\omega(\lambda) &\text{if } \omega(\lambda)>0.\end{cases}$$

The cranks of the partitions of the integers 4, 5, 6 are computed in the following tables.

Cranks of the partitions of 4

Partition λ	Largest part ℓ(λ)	Number of 1's ω(λ)	Number of parts larger than ω(λ) μ(λ)	Crank c(λ)
{4}	4	0	1	4
{3,1}	3	1	1	0
{2,2}	2	0	2	2
{2,1,1}	2	2	0	−2
{1,1,1,1}	1	4	0	−4

Cranks of the partitions of 5

Partition λ	Largest part ℓ(λ)	Number of 1's ω(λ)	Number of parts larger than ω(λ) μ(λ)	Crank c(λ)
{5}	5	0	1	5
{4,1}	4	1	1	0
{3,2}	3	0	2	3
{3,1,1}	3	2	1	−1
{2,2,1}	2	1	2	1
{2,1,1,1}	2	3	0	−3
{1,1,1,1,1}	1	5	0	−5

Cranks of the partitions of 6

Partition λ	Largest part ℓ(λ)	Number of 1's ω(λ)	Number of parts larger than ω(λ) μ(λ)	Crank c(λ)
{6}	6	0	1	6
{5,1}	5	1	1	0
{4,2}	4	0	2	4
{4,1,1}	4	2	1	−1
{3,3}	3	0	2	3
{3,2,1}	3	1	2	1
{3,1,1,1}	3	3	0	−3
{2,2,2}	2	0	3	2
{2,2,1,1}	2	2	0	−2
{2,1,1,1,1}	2	4	0	−4
{1,1,1,1,1,1}	1	6	0	−6

== Notations ==
For all integers n ≥ 0 and all integers m, the number of partitions of n with crank equal to m is denoted by M(m,n) except for n = 1 where M(−1,1) = −M(0,1) = M(1,1) = 1 as given by the following generating function. The number of partitions of n with crank equal to m modulo q is denoted by M(m,q,n).

The generating function for M(m,n) is given below:

$$\sum_{n=0}^{\infty}\sum_{m=-\infty}^\infty M(m,n) z^mq^n = \prod_{n=1}^\infty \frac{(1-q^n)}{(1-zq^n)(1-z^{-1}q^n)}$$

== Basic result ==
Andrews and Garvan proved the following result which shows that the crank as defined above does meet the conditions given by Dyson.

- M(0, 5, 5n + 4) = M(1, 5, 5n + 4) = M(2, 5, 5n + 4) = M(3, 5, 5n + 4) = M(4, 5, 5n + 4) = p(5n + 4) / 5
- M(0, 7, 7n + 5) = M(1, 7, 7n + 5) = M(2, 7, 7n + 5) = M(3, 7, 7n + 5) = M(4, 7, 7n + 5) = M(5, 7, 7n + 5) = M(6, 7, 7n + 5) = p(7n + 5) / 7
- M(0, 11, 11n + 6) = M(1, 11, 11n + 6) = M(2, 11, 11n + 6) = M(3, 11, 11n + 6) = . . . = M(9, 11, 11n + 6) = M(10, 11, 11n + 6) = p(11n + 6) / 11

The concepts of rank and crank can both be used to classify partitions of certain integers into subclasses of equal size. However the two concepts produce different subclasses of partitions. This is illustrated in the following two tables.

Classification of the partitions of the integer 9 based on cranks

Partitions with crank ≡ 0 (mod 5)	Partitions with crank ≡ 1 (mod 5)	Partitions with crank ≡ 2 (mod 5)	Partitions with crank ≡ 3 (mod 5)	Partitions with crank ≡ 4 (mod 5)
{ 8, 1 }	{ 6, 3 }	{ 7, 2 }	{ 6, 1, 1, 1 }	{ 9 }
{ 5, 4 }	{ 6, 2, 1 }	{ 5, 1, 1, 1, 1 }	{ 4, 2, 1, 1, 1 }	{ 7, 1, 1 }
{ 5, 2, 2 }	{ 5, 3, 1 }	{ 4, 2, 2, 1 }	{ 3, 3, 3 }	{ 5, 2, 1, 1 }
{ 4, 3, 1, 1 }	{ 4, 4, 1 }	{ 3, 3, 2, 1 }	{ 3, 2, 2, 2 }	{ 4, 3, 2 }
{ 4, 1, 1, 1, 1, 1 }	{ 3, 2, 1, 1, 1, 1 }	{ 3, 3, 1, 1, 1 }	{ 2, 2, 2, 2, 1 }	{ 3, 2, 2, 1, 1 }
{ 2, 2, 1, 1, 1, 1, 1 }	{ 1, 1, 1, 1, 1, 1, 1, 1, 1 }	{ 2, 2, 2, 1, 1, 1 }	{ 2, 1, 1, 1, 1, 1, 1, 1}	{ 3, 1, 1, 1, 1, 1, 1 }

Classification of the partitions of the integer 9 based on ranks

Partitions with rank ≡ 0 (mod 5)	Partitions with rank ≡ 1 (mod 5)	Partitions with rank ≡ 2 (mod 5)	Partitions with rank ≡ 3 (mod 5)	Partitions with rank ≡ 4 (mod 5)
{ 7, 2 }	{ 8, 1 }	{ 6, 1, 1, 1 }	{ 9 }	{ 7, 1, 1 }
{ 5, 1, 1, 1, 1 }	{ 5, 2, 1, 1 }	{ 5, 3, 1}	{ 6, 2, 1 }	{ 6, 3 }
{ 4, 3, 1, 1 }	{ 4, 4, 1 }	{ 5, 2, 2 }	{ 5, 4 }	{ 4, 2, 1, 1, 1 }
{ 4, 2, 2, 1 }	{ 4, 3, 2 }	{ 3, 2, 1, 1, 1, 1 }	{ 3, 3, 1, 1, 1 }	{ 3, 3, 2, 1 }
{ 3, 3, 3 }	{ 3, 1, 1, 1, 1, 1, 1 }	{ 2, 2, 2, 2, 1 }	{ 4, 1, 1, 1, 1, 1 }	{ 3, 2, 2, 2 }
{ 2, 2, 1, 1, 1, 1, 1 }	{ 2, 2, 2, 1, 1, 1 }	{ 1, 1, 1, 1, 1, 1, 1, 1, 1 }	{ 3, 2, 2, 1, 1}	{ 2, 1, 1, 1, 1, 1, 1, 1 }

== Ramanujan and cranks ==
Recent work by Bruce C. Berndt and his coauthors argued that Ramanujan knew about the crank, although not in the form that Andrews and Garvan have defined. In a systematic study of the Lost Notebook of Ramanujan, Berndt and his coauthors have given substantial evidence that Ramanujan knew about the dissections of the crank generating function.
