= Euler function =

Mathematical function

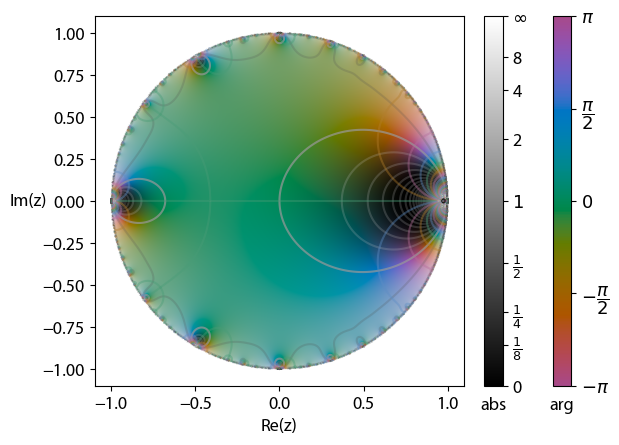
Domain coloring plot of ϕ on the complex plane

Euler function $\phi(x)$.

In mathematics, the Euler function is given by

$$\phi(q)=\prod_{k=1}^\infty (1-q^k),\quad |q|<1.$$

Named after Leonhard Euler, it is a model example of a q-series and provides the prototypical example of a relation between combinatorics and complex analysis.

== Properties ==
The coefficient $p(k)$ in the formal power series expansion for $1/\phi(q)$ gives the number of partitions of k. That is,

$$\frac{1}{\phi(q)}=\sum_{k=0}^\infty p(k) q^k$$

where $p$ is the partition function.

The Euler identity, also known as the Pentagonal number theorem, is

$$\phi(q)=\sum_{n=-\infty}^\infty (-1)^n q^{(3n^2-n)/2}.$$

$(3n^2-n)/2$ is a pentagonal number.

The Euler function is related to the Dedekind eta function as

$$\phi (e^{2\pi i\tau})= e^{-\pi i\tau/12} \eta(\tau).$$

The Euler function may be expressed as a q-Pochhammer symbol:

$$\phi(q) = (q;q)_{\infty}.$$

The logarithm of the Euler function is the sum of the logarithms in the product expression, each of which may be expanded about q = 0, yielding

$$\ln(\phi(q)) = -\sum_{n=1}^\infty\frac{1}{n}\,\frac{q^n}{1-q^n},$$

which is a Lambert series with coefficients -1/n. The logarithm of the Euler function may therefore be expressed as

$$\ln(\phi(q)) = \sum_{n=1}^\infty b_n q^n$$

where $b_n=-\sum_{d|n}\frac{1}{d}=$ -[1/1, 3/2, 4/3, 7/4, 6/5, 12/6, 8/7, 15/8, 13/9, 18/10, ...] (see OEIS A000203)

On account of the identity $\sigma(n) = \sum_{d|n} d = \sum_{d|n} \frac{n}{d}$ , where $\sigma(n)$ is the sum-of-divisors function, this may also be written as

$$\ln(\phi(q)) = -\sum_{n=1}^\infty \frac{\sigma(n)}{n}\ q^n$$.

Also if $a,b\in\mathbb{R}^+$ and $ab=\pi ^2$, then

$$a^{1/4}e^{-a/12}\phi (e^{-2a})=b^{1/4}e^{-b/12}\phi (e^{-2b}).$$

== Special values ==
The next identities come from Ramanujan's Notebooks:

$$\phi(e^{-\pi})=\frac{e^{\pi/24}\Gamma\left(\frac14\right)}{2^{7/8}\pi^{3/4}}$$

$$\phi(e^{-2\pi})=\frac{e^{\pi/12}\Gamma\left(\frac14\right)}{2\pi^{3/4}}$$

$$\phi(e^{-4\pi})=\frac{e^{\pi/6}\Gamma\left(\frac14\right)}{2^{{11}/8}\pi^{3/4}}$$

$$\phi(e^{-8\pi})=\frac{e^{\pi/3}\Gamma\left(\frac14\right)}{2^{29/16}\pi^{3/4}}(\sqrt{2}-1)^{1/4}$$

Using the Pentagonal number theorem, exchanging sum and integral, and then invoking complex-analytic methods, one derives

$$\int_0^1\phi(q)\,\mathrm{d}q = \frac{8 \sqrt{\frac{3}{23}} \pi  \sinh \left(\frac{\sqrt{23} \pi }{6}\right)}{2 \cosh \left(\frac{\sqrt{23} \pi }{3}\right)-1}.$$

== See also ==
- List of topics named after Leonhard Euler
