= Henryk Minc =

Polish mathematician

Henryk Minc (November 12, 1919 – July 15, 2013) was a Polish-born, British-educated, American professor of mathematics. He is known for his 1963 conjecture of what is now called the Bregman–Minc inequality (or Bregman's theorem), proved in 1973 by Lev M. Bregman.

== Biography ==
Henryk Minc was born in Łódź, Poland to a Jewish family and had two brothers. In 1937 he graduated from secondary school in Poland. In 1938 he matriculated at Belgium's University of Liège. He returned to Lodz in August 1938 during summer vacation, but the outbreak of WW II caught his family by surprise. In November 1939 Henryk Minc escaped from Poland to Belgium. He and his two brothers survived WW II but their parents died in Auschwitz in August 1944. In May 1940 Henryk Minc escaped from Belgium to France, where he joined the Polish army. At the end of June 1940 he, as a member of a Polish engineer company, was evacuated to England and then stationed in Scotland until the allied invasion of Normandy in 1944. Minc was sent in May 1941 to an officer engineer school in Dundee, Scotland, and in 1944 was commissioned as a second lieutenant in the British army. Minc's Polish army unit was stationed in Tayport, Scotland. In April 1943 he married Catherine Taylor Duncan. The couple became the parents of three sons. In 1944 he was mainly involved in dismantling minefields. After eight years of military service, he matriculated at the University of Edinburgh. There he graduated with an M.A. in 1955 and a doctorate in mathematics in 1959. His doctoral dissertation Logarithmetics, Index Polynomials, and Bifurcating Root Trees was supervised by Ivor Etherington.

From 1956 to 1958, Minc taught at Morgan Academy in Dundee, Scotland. From 1957 to 1958 he was lecturer at Dundee Technology College (now renamed Abertay University). At Canada's University of British Columbia, he was a lecturer from 1958 to 1959 and an assistant professor from 1959 to 1960. In 1960 he and his family immigrated to the United States. At the University of Florida, Gainesville he was an associate professor from 1960 to 1963. At the University of California, Santa Barbara (UCSB), he was a full professor from 1963 to 1990, when he retired as professor emeritus. During the 1970s he was a visiting professor at the Technion – Israel Institute of Technology.

In the early part of his mathematical career, Henryk Minc was interested in non-associative algebras and the intuitionist foundation of mathematics. He was one of the important mathematicians, along with Robert Charles Thompson and Ky Fan, recruited by Marvin Marcus, for the linear algebra and matrix theory school in UCSB's mathematics department. Minc and Marcus collaborated extensively. Minc was a leading expert on permanents and nonnegative matrices. At UCSB he was an outstanding member of the semiautonomous Institute for Interdisciplinary Applications of Algebra and Combinatorics and served on the editorial staff of Linear Algebra and Its Applications. He was the author or co-author of 10 mathematical textbooks and numerous research publications.

In 1966, Marvin Marcus and Henryk Minc received the Mathematical Association of America's Lester R. Ford Award for their 1965 article Permanents.

== Hobbies ==
Minc published articles on Biblical archaeology and collected ancient Jewish coins and other antiquities. He spoke five languages and was able to read and understand ancient Hebrew and ancient Greek. Over a forty-year period for almost every day, he swam about a mile (1.6 km) each day. He played the harpsichord and the recorder, as well as bagpipes. During his retirement, he was an active participant in the Santa Barbara Scottish Society and, with his wife Catherine, visited Scotland many times. He developed a love for the poetry of Robert Burns and collected many books and manuscripts written by Burns. Minc was delighted when he was appointed the honorary president of the Robert Burns World Federation.

== Family ==
Henryk Minc was predeceased by his wife Catherine (1922–2008). Upon his death in 2013 in Santa Barbara, he was survived by his three sons, Robert (1944–2019), Ralph, and Raymond, and a grandson Jeffrey.

== Selected publications ==
=== Articles ===
- Minc, H. (1957). "XXI.—Index Polynomials and Bifurcating Root-Trees". Proceedings of the Royal Society of Edinburgh, Section A: Mathematical and Physical Sciences. 64 (4): 319–341. doi:10.1017/S008045410000755X.
- Minc, H. (1959). "A Problem in Partitions: Enumeration of Elements of a given Degree in the free commutative entropic cyclic Groupoid". Proceedings of the Edinburgh Mathematical Society. 11 (4): 223–224. doi:10.1017/S0013091500021945.
- Minc, H. (1959). "Theorems on Nonassociative Number Theory". The American Mathematical Monthly. 66 (6): 486–488. doi:10.1080/00029890.1959.11989334.
- Maxfield, John E.; Minc, Henryk (1962). "On the Matrix Equation X ′ X = A". Proceedings of the Edinburgh Mathematical Society. 13 (2): 125–129. doi:10.1017/S0013091500014681.
- Minc, H. (1963). "Upper bounds for permanents of (0, 1)-matrices" (PDF). Bulletin of the American Mathematical Society. 69 (6): 789–791. doi:10.1090/S0002-9904-1963-11031-9.
- Minc, Henryk; Sathre, Leroy (1964). "Some Inequalities involving ( r !)^{1/ r}". Proceedings of the Edinburgh Mathematical Society. 14: 41–46. doi:10.1017/S0013091500011214.
- Minc, Henryk (1964). "Permanents of (0, 1)-Circulants". Canadian Mathematical Bulletin. 7 (2): 253–263. doi:10.4153/CMB-1964-023-3.
- Marcus, M.; Minc, H. (1964). "The Hadamard theorem for permanents" (PDF). Proceedings of the American Mathematical Society. 15 (6): 967–973. doi:10.1090/S0002-9939-1964-0168585-9.
- Marcus, M.; Minc, H. (1965). "Generalized matrix functions" (PDF). Transactions of the American Mathematical Society. 116: 316–329. doi:10.1090/S0002-9947-1965-0194445-9.
- Minc, Henryk (1970). "On the Maximal Eigenvector of a Positive Matrix". SIAM Journal on Numerical Analysis. 7 (3): 424–427. Bibcode:1970SJNA....7..424M. doi:10.1137/0707035.
- Minc, Henryk (1971). "Rearrangements". Transactions of the American Mathematical Society. 159: 497–504. doi:10.1090/S0002-9947-1971-0283002-4.
- London, David; Minc, Henryk (1972). "Eigenvalues of matrices with prescribed entries". Proceedings of the American Mathematical Society. 34: 8. doi:10.1090/S0002-9939-1972-0352125-X.
- Minc, Henryk (1981). "Inverse elementary divisor problem for nonnegative matrices". Proceedings of the American Mathematical Society. 83 (4): 665–669. doi:10.1090/S0002-9939-1981-0630033-X.
- Minc, Henryk (1982). "Inverse elementary divisors problem for doubly stochastic matrices^{†}". Linear and Multilinear Algebra. 11 (2): 121–131. doi:10.1080/03081088208817437.
- Minc, Henryk (1987). "Theory of permanents 1982–1985". Linear and Multilinear Algebra. 21 (2): 109–148. doi:10.1080/03081088708817786.
- Minc, Henryk (1987). "Permanental compounds and permanents of (0, 1)-circulants". Linear Algebra and Its Applications. 86: 11–42. doi:10.1016/0024-3795(87)90285-0.

=== Books ===
- Marcus, Marvin; Minc, Henryk (January 1992). A Survey of Matrix Theory and Matrix Inequalities. Courier Corporation. ISBN 978-0-486-67102-4. LCCN 91039704. 1st edition. Boston: Prindle, Weber & Schmidt. 1964. LCCN 64014269.
- Minc, Henryk (28 December 1984). Permanents. Cambridge University Press. ISBN 978-0-521-30226-5.
  - Permanents. Encyclopedia of Mathematics and its Applications, vol. 6 (1st ed.). Reading, Massachusetts: Addison-Wesley. 1978; xviii + 205 pages
- Minc, Henryk (1988). Nonnegative Matrices. Wiley-Interscience Series in Discrete Mathematics and Optimization. John Wiley. ISBN 0471839663; 206 pages, hbk
