= Robert Charles Thompson =

Canadian-American mathematician

- Born: April 21, 1931; Winnipeg, Manitoba
- Died: December 10, 1995 (aged 64); Santa Barbara, California

Robert Charles Thompson (April 21, 1931 – December 10, 1995) was a Canadian-American mathematician, who gained an international reputation for his research on linear algebra and matrix theory.

== Biography ==
Thompson grew up near Vancouver, British Columbia. He graduated from the University of British Columbia in 1955 with a B.Sc. and in 1957 with an M.Sc. In 1960 he graduated from with a Ph.D. in mathematics from Caltech. His Ph.D. thesis Commutators in the Special and General Linear Groups was supervised by Olga Taussky-Todd. In 1961 the Transactions of the American Mathematical Society published a paper based upon his thesis. In the 1961 paper and in two subsequent 1962 papers, he settled several important open questions. From 1963 to 1966 Thompson was a faculty member at the University of British Columbia. From 1966 until his death in 1995, he was a professor of mathematics at the University of California, Santa Barbara (UCSB). At UCSB, he began a career-long collaboration with Marvin Marcus on some research, as well as the founding and development of UCSB's Institute for the Interdisciplinary Application of Algebra and Combinatorics. Thompson and Marcus recruited several prominent mathematicians, including Ky Fan, Eugene Johnsen, Henryk Minc, and Morris Newman (now known for Newman's conjecture). UCSB's mathematics department gained fame for promoting research in linear algebra and matrix theory, influencing matrix research in Israel, Hong Kong, Portugal, Spain, and elsewhere.

Thompson was the author of four undergraduate textbooks and the author or co-author of more than 120 articles. He did important research on invariant factors, integral matrices, principal submatrices, and the Baker-Campbell-Hausdorff formula. His research was honored with his appointment as lecturer for the 1988 Johns Hopkins Summer Lecture Series.

Thompson was one of the founders of the International Linear Algebra Society (ILAS) and of the journal Linear and Multilinear Algebra. He was a contributing editor of Linear Algebra and its Applications (initiated in 1968) and an editor of the SIAM Journal on Matrix Analysis and Applications.

Upon his death in 1995, Robert C. Thompson was survived by his wife Natalie. In 1996 he was posthumously awarded the Hans Schneider Prize in Linear Algebra of the ILAS.

== Selected publications ==
=== Articles ===
- Thompson, R. C. (1968). "On the matrices AB and BA" (PDF). Linear Algebra and Its Applications. 1 (1): 43–58. doi:10.1016/0024-3795(68)90047-5.
- Thompson, R.C. (1972). "Principal submatrices IX: Interlacing inequalities for singular values of submatrices" (PDF). Linear Algebra and Its Applications. 5 (1): 1–12. doi:10.1016/0024-3795(72)90013-4. (over 190 citations)
- Thompson, R. C. (1974). "On the eigenvalues of a product of unitary matrices I". Linear and Multilinear Algebra. 2: 13–24. doi:10.1080/03081087408817038.
- Thompson, R. C. (1977). "Singular Values, Diagonal Elements, and Convexity". SIAM Journal on Applied Mathematics. 32: 39–63. doi:10.1137/0132003.
- Thompson, R.C. (1978). "Matrix type metric inequalities". Linear and Multilinear Algebra. 5 (4): 303–319. doi:10.1080/03081087808817211.
- Thompson, R. C. (1979). "Interlacing inequalities for invariant factors" (PDF). Linear Algebra and Its Applications. 24: 1–31. doi:10.1016/0024-3795(79)90144-7. (over 180 citations)
- Thompson, Robert C. (1982). "Cyclic relations and the Goldberg coefficients in the Campbell-Baker-Hausdorff formula". Proceedings of the American Mathematical Society. 86: 12–14. doi:10.1090/S0002-9939-1982-0663855-0.
- Marcus, M.; Newman, M.; Thompson, R.C.; Leipnik, R.B.; Minc, H. (1979). "Basic Research in the Mathematical Foundations of Stability Theory, Control Theory and Numerical Linear Algebra". Defense Technical Information Center (DTIC). doi:10.21236/ADA082067; technical report Accession Number ADA082067; authors' organization: U.C. Santa Barbara Institure for Algebra and Combinatorics
- Minc, H.; Goldberg, M.; Newman, M.; Thompson, R. C.; Marcus, M. (1982). "Eigenvalues, Numerical Ranges, Stability Analysis, and Applications of Number Theory to Computing". Defense Technical Information Center (DTIC). doi:10.21236/ADA125074; technical report Accession Number ADA125074; authors' organization: U.C. Santa Barbara Institute for the Interdisciplinary Applications of Algebra and Combinatorics
- Thompson, R. C. (1982). "An inequality for invariant factors" (PDF). Proceedings of the American Mathematical Society. 86 (1): 9–11. doi:10.1090/S0002-9939-1982-0663854-9.
- Thompson, Robert C. (1982). "The Smith Form, the Inversion Rule for 2X2 Matrices, and the Uniqueness of the Invariant Factors for Finitely Generated Modules" (PDF). Linear Algebra and Its Applications. 44: 197–201. doi:10.1016/0024-3795(82)90017-9.
- Thompson, Robert C. (1983). "Author vs. Referee: A Case History for Middle Level Mathematicians". The American Mathematical Monthly. 90 (10): 661–668. doi:10.1080/00029890.1983.11971308.
- Thompson, Robert C.; Newman, Morris; Minc, Henryk; Marcus, Marvin; Goldberg, Moshe (1983). "Stability Analysis for Difference Schemes, Problems in Applied Linear Algebra, and Application of Number Theory to Computing". Defense Technical Information Center (DTIC). doi:10.21236/ADA133654; technical report Accession Number ADA133654; authors' organization: U.C. Santa Barbara Institute for the Interdisciplinary Applications of Algebra and Combinatorics
- Thompson, Robert C. (1986). "Proof of a conjectured exponential formula". Linear and Multilinear Algebra. 19 (2): 187–197. doi:10.1080/03081088608817715.
- Newman, Morris; Thompson, Robert C. (1987). "Numerical values of Goldberg's coefficients in the series for 𝑙𝑜𝑔(𝑒^{𝑥}𝑒^{𝑦})". Mathematics of Computation. 48 (177): 265–271. doi:10.1090/S0025-5718-1987-0866114-9.
- Thompson, Robert C. (1987). "Invariant factors of integral quaternion matrices". Linear and Multilinear Algebra. 21 (4): 395–417. doi:10.1080/03081088708817814.
- Thompson, R. C. (1991). "Pencils of complex and real symmetric and skew matrices" (PDF). Linear Algebra and Its Applications. 147: 323–371. doi:10.1016/0024-3795(91)90238-R. (over 270 citations)
- Day, J.; So, W.; Thompson, Robert C. (1991). "Some properties of the Campbell Baker Hausdorff series". Linear and Multilinear Algebra. 29 (3–4): 207–224. doi:10.1080/03081089108818072.
- Thompson, Robert C. (1992). "The eigenvalue spreads of a hermitian matrix and its principal submatrices". Linear and Multilinear Algebra. 32 (3–4): 327–333. doi:10.1080/03081089208818173.
- So, Wasin; Thompson, Robert C.; Zhang, Fuzhen (1994). "The numerical range of normal matrices with quaternion entries". Linear and Multilinear Algebra. 37 (1–3): 175–195. doi:10.1080/03081089408818320. 1994
- Thompson, Robert C. (1997). "The upper numerical range of a quaternionic matrix is not a complex numerical range". Linear Algebra and Its Applications. 254 (1–3): 19–28. doi:10.1016/S0024-3795(97)81634-5.
