= Yboon García Ramos =

Peruvian mathematician

- Born: September 1977 (age 48); Lima
- Education: National University of Engineering; Université des Antilles et de la Guyane
- Known for: Studied monotone operators, quasiconvex functions, and variational analysis, which are mathematical tools used to solve optimization and equilibrium problems
- Scientific career
- Fields: Applied Mathematics, Applied Economics
- Thesis: Sums of monotone operators and the subdifferential of quasiconvex functions

Yboon Victoria García Ramos is a Peruvian mathematician with a Ph.D. from the Université des Antilles et de la Guyane and the National University of Engineering. Her research focus lies in applied mathematics, mathematical economics, and nonlinear analysis. She currently serves as a Full Professor and researcher at Universidad del Pacífico. In 2019, she was awarded the “Sofia Kovalevskaya Prize: Outstanding Senior Peruvian Woman Researcher in Mathematics.”

== Education ==
Her interest in science led her to pursue a career in mathematics. She began her studies at the National University of Engineering where she continued until earning a Master's degree in Mathematics. She earned her Ph.D. at the Université des Antilles et de la Guyane and the National University of Engineering in operator theory. She completed a postdoctoral fellowship at the Center for Mathematical Modeling at the University of Chile.

== Career ==
García has academic expertise in applied mathematics, mathematical economics, and nonlinear analysis. She has served as a thesis advisor for undergraduate students at UNI, and is currently a researcher at the Institute of Mathematics and Related Sciences (Instituto de Matemática y Ciencias Afines, IMCA). She is a member of both the Peruvian Mathematical Society and the Société mathématique de France. In recognition of her contributions to science and technology, she has been accredited as a qualified researcher in RENACYT, the registry of Peruvian researchers .

As coordinator of the Mathematics II course in the Department of Economics at Universidad del Pacífico, she has continued to foster mathematical education and research.

=== Research and publications ===
Her research has significantly contributed to the study of monotone operators, quasiconvex optimization, and variational analysis, with applications in variational inequality problems and game theory.

In 2003, García co-authored an article with the co-founder of IMCA titled "Applications of the Ky Fan Conjecture." The paper presents Ky Fan's lemma as a tool for establishing existence results in various fields, including variational inequality problems, equilibrium problems, and game theory.

In 2014, she played a key role as the principal organizer of the Latin American Workshop on Optimization and Control. Previously, between 2011 and 2012, she served as the scientific lead of the Peruvian team in the Stic-Amsud OVIMINE project, further solidifying her impact in international research collaborations.

In 2016, she published her first book, Cálculo Diferencial e Integral in collaboration with Oswaldo Velásquez. It covers differential and integral calculus while also introducing fundamental mathematical concepts and their applications in economics and business science.

== Works ==
=== Books ===
- García, Yboon (2016). Cálculo diferencial e integral (1a ed.). Lima: Universidad del Pacífico. ISBN 978-9972-57-369-9.

=== Research contributions ===
García-Ramos has published various articles in scientific journals of high impact in the area of convex analysis and mathematical programming and optimization. Her most relevant publications are:

- Bueno, Orestes; Cotrina, John; García, Yboon (2023). "Existence and uniqueness of maximal elements for preference relations: Variational approach". Journal of Optimization Theory and Applications. 198 (3): 1246–1263. arXiv:2301.12329. doi:10.1007/s10957-023-02251-y. ISSN 0022-3239.
- Flores-Bazán, F.; García, Y.; Hadjisavvas, N. (1 September 2021). "Characterizing quasiconvexity of the pointwise infimum of a family of arbitrary translations of quasiconvex functions, with applications to sums and quasiconvex optimization". Mathematical Programming. 189 (1): 315–337. doi:10.1007/s10107-021-01647-w. ISSN 1436-4646.
- Aussel, D.; García, Y. (1 January 2014). "On extensions of kenderov's single-valuedness result for monotone maps and quasimonotone maps". SIAM Journal on Optimization. 24 (2): 702–713. doi:10.1137/120880215. ISSN 1052-6234.
- Aussel, D.; Garcia, Y.; Hadjisavvas, N. (2010). "Single-Directional Property of Multivalued Maps and Variational Systems". SIAM Journal on Optimization. 20 (3): 1274–1285. doi:10.1137/080735618. hdl:10533/143038. ISSN 1052-6234.
- García, Yboon; Sosa, Wilfredo (2003). "Aplicaciones de Lema de Ky Fan". TECNIA. 13 (2): 75–86. ISSN 2309-0413.

== Awards and honours ==
In 2019, Dr. Yboon García was awarded the “Sofia Kovalevskaya Prize: Outstanding Senior Peruvian Woman Researcher in Mathematics.” This distinction aims to promote greater participation of women in mathematical sciences research. It is granted to female scientists with over 15 years of research experience who have demonstrated academic excellence.
