= Marvin Marcus =

American mathematician

Marvin David Marcus (July 31, 1927, Albuquerque, New Mexico – February 20, 2016, Santa Barbara, California) was an American mathematician, known as a leading expert on linear and multilinear algebra.

== Education and career ==
From 1944 to 1946, Marvin Marcus served in the United States Navy. At the University of California, Berkeley, he graduated with a bachelor's degree in mathematics in 1950 and a Ph.D. in mathematics in 1953. His Ph.D. thesis The application of fixed-point theorems to the perturbation of ordinary differential equations was supervised by Stephen P. L. Diliberto. At the University of British Columbia (UBC), Marcus was an instructor from 1954 to 1955, an assistant professor from 1955 to 1956, and an associate professor from 1957 to 1962. At UBC he became a friend of Henryk Minc and supervised the master's thesis of Robert Charles Thompson. For the academic year 1956–1957 Marcus was on sabbatical in Washington, D.C. at the National Bureau of Standards, where he worked with Morris Newman (1924–2007). At the University of California, Santa Barbara (UCSB), he was a full professor from 1962 to 1991, when he retired as professor emeritus. He chaired UCSB's mathematics department from 1963 and 1969 and created what gained an international reputation as the "Santa Barbara School of Linear Algebra". While chairing the department, he hired Henryk Minc, Robert Charles Thompson, and Ky Fan and brought many distinguished visiting mathematicians: Hans Heilbronn, Marshall Hall, Magnus Hestenes, Alan J. Hoffman, H. J. Ryser, Hans Schneider, Olga Taussky-Todd, John "Jack" Todd, and Hans Zassenhaus, as well as the then unknown Richard A. Brualdi. At UCSB, Marcus held an appointment in the mathematics department from 1962 to 1983, joint appointments in both the mathematics and computer science departments from 1983 to 1987, and an appointment solely in the computer science department from 1987 to 1991. He founded UCSB's Microcomputer Laboratory in 1979.

During the years 1963 to 1969, UCSB mathematicians did significant research on such topics as monotone matrix functions in the sense of Charles Loewner, linear operators on symmetry classes of tensors, and immanants and other generalized matrix functions. At UCSB Marcus established the semiautonomous Institute for Interdisciplinary Applications of Algebra and Combinatorics, which he directed from 1973 to 1979. Marcus was one of the founding editors of the journal Linear Algebra and Its Applications. With Robert Charles Thompson, he was the co-founder of the journal Linear and Multilinear Algebra, whose first issue was published in 1973. He was the section editor for linear algebra in Addison-Wesley's series Encyclopedia of mathematics and its applications.

According to Marcus's former doctoral student Robert Grone, Marcus did pioneering, fundamental research in "numerical ranges, matrix inequalities, linear preservers and multilinear algebra". Marcus was the author or co-author of more than 200 articles and problem solutions and more than 20 books. His three most important books might be Finite Dimensional Multilinear Algebra, Part I (1973, Marcel Dekker), Finite Dimensional Multilinear Algebra, Part II (1975, Marcel Dekker), and A Survey of Matrix Theory and Matrix Inequalities (1st edition 1964; reprint 1969; Dover reprint 1992).

In 1966, Marcus and Minc received the Mathematical Association of America's Lester R. Ford Award for their 1965 article Permanents.

== Personal life ==
In 1951 in California, Marvin Marcus married Arlen Ingrid Sahlman (1923–2005). They became the parents of a son and a daughter, but later divorced. Marvin Marcus was predeceased by his second wife — there were no children from his second marriage. He enjoyed playing tennis and reading about science and narratives written by travelers.

== Selected publications ==
=== Articles ===
- Marcus, Marvin; Moyls, B. N. (1959). "Linear Transformations on Algebras of Matrices". Canadian Journal of Mathematics. 11: 61–66. doi:10.4153/CJM-1959-008-0.
- Marcus, M.; Moyls, B.N. (1959). "Transformations on tensor product spaces" (PDF). Pacific Journal of Mathematics. 9 (4): 1215–1221. doi:10.2140/pjm.1959.9.1215.
- Marcus, Marvin; Purves, Roger (1959). "Linear Transformations on Algebras of Matrices: The Invariance of the Elementary Symmetric Functions". Canadian Journal of Mathematics. 11: 383–396. doi:10.4153/CJM-1959-039-4.
- Marcus, Marvin; Newman, Morris (1959). "On the minimum of the permanent of a doubly stochastic matrix". Duke Mathematical Journal. 26. doi:10.1215/S0012-7094-59-02606-7.
- Marcus, Marvin; Newman, Morris (1962). "The sum of the elements of the powers of a matrix". Pacific Journal of Mathematics. 12 (2): 627–635. doi:10.2140/pjm.1962.12.627.
- Marcus, Marvin (1962). "Linear Operations on Matrices". The American Mathematical Monthly. 69 (9): 837–847. doi:10.1080/00029890.1962.11989991.
- Marcus, Marvin (1963). "The permanent analogue of the Hadamard determinant theorem". Bulletin of the American Mathematical Society. 69 (4): 494–497. doi:10.1090/S0002-9904-1963-10975-1.
- Marcus, M.; Minc, H. (1964). "The Hadamard theorem for permanents" (PDF). Proceedings of the American Mathematical Society. 15 (6): 967–973. doi:10.1090/S0002-9939-1964-0168585-9.
- Marcus, M.; Minc, H. (1965). "Generalized matrix functions" (PDF). Transactions of the American Mathematical Society. 116: 316–329. doi:10.1090/S0002-9947-1965-0194445-9.
- Marcus, Marvin (1973). "Derivations, Plücker Relations, and the Numerical Range". Indiana University Mathematics Journal. 22 (12): 1137–1149. doi:10.1512/iumj.1973.22.22094. JSTOR 24890537.
- Grone, Robert; Marcus, Marvin (1977). "Isometries of matrix algebras". Journal of Algebra. 47: 180–189. doi:10.1016/0021-8693(77)90218-6.
- Marcus, Marvin; Andresen, Patricia (1977). "Constrained extrema of bilinear functionals". Monatshefte for Mathematik. 84 (3): 219–235. doi:10.1007/BF01538033. S2CID 120690556.
- Marcus, Marvin; Chollet, John (1980). "Linear groups defined by decomposable tensor equalities". Linear and Multilinear Algebra. 8 (3): 207–212. doi:10.1080/03081088008817319.
- Marcus, Marvin; Kidman, Kent; Sandy, Markus (1984). "Products of elementary doubly stochastic matrices". Linear and Multilinear Algebra. 15 (3–4): 331–340. doi:10.1080/03081088408817601.
- Marcus, Marvin; Sandy, Markus (1985). "Conditions for the generalized numerical range to be real". Linear Algebra and Its Applications. 71: 219–239. doi:10.1016/0024-3795(85)90249-6.
- Marcus, Marvin; Chollet, John (1986). "Construction of orthonormal bases in higher symmetry classes of tensors". Linear and Multilinear Algebra. 19 (2): 133–140. doi:10.1080/03081088608817710.
- Marcus, Marvin; Pesce, Claire (1987). "Computer generated numerical ranges and some resulting theorems". Linear and Multilinear Algebra. 20 (2): 121–157. doi:10.1080/03081088708817748.
- Marcus, Marvin; Smith, Terence R. (1989). "A note on the determinants and eigenvalues of distance matrices". Linear and Multilinear Algebra. 25 (3): 219–230. doi:10.1080/03081088908817944.
- Marcus, Marvin (1990). "Determinants of Sums". The College Mathematics Journal. 21 (2): 130–135. doi:10.1080/07468342.1990.11973297.

=== Books ===
- Marcus, Marvin; Minc, Henryk (January 1992). A Survey of Matrix Theory and Matrix Inequalities. Courier Corporation. ISBN 978-0-486-67102-4. LCCN 91039704. 1st edition. Boston: Prindle, Weber & Schmidt. 1964. LCCN 64014269. reprint. Prindle, Weber & Schmidt. 1969.
- Marcus, Marvin (January 1993). A Survey of Finite Mathematics. Courier Corporation. ISBN 978-0-486-67553-4; 1st edition 1969
- Marcus, Marvin (1973). Finite Dimensional Multilinear Algebra, Part I. New York: Marcel Dekker; 292 pages
- Marcus, Marvin (1975). Finite Dimensional Multilinear Algebra, Part II. New York: Marcel Dekker; 718 pages
