= Ky Fan inequality =

Mathematical inequality

In mathematics, the term Ky Fan inequality refers to an inequality involving the geometric mean and arithmetic mean of two sets of real numbers within the unit interval. The result was published on page 5 of the book Inequalities by Edwin F. Beckenbach and Richard E. Bellman (1961), who attribute it to an unpublished result by Ky Fan. They discuss the inequality in connection with the inequality of arithmetic and geometric means and Augustin Louis Cauchy's proof of that inequality via forward-backward induction—a method that can also be used to prove the Ky Fan inequality.

This inequality is a special case of Levinson's inequality and serves as a foundation for several generalizations and refinements, some of which are referenced below.

== Statement of the classical version ==
If with $0\le x_i\le \frac{1}{2}$ for i = 1, ..., n, then

$$\frac{ \bigl(\prod_{i=1}^n x_i\bigr)^{1/n} }
{ \bigl(\prod_{i=1}^n (1-x_i)\bigr)^{1/n} }
\le
\frac{ \frac1n \sum_{i=1}^n x_i }
{ \frac1n \sum_{i=1}^n (1-x_i) }$$

with equality if and only if x_{1} = x_{2} = ⋅ ⋅ ⋅ = x_{n}.

=== Remark ===
Let

$$A_n:=\frac1n\sum_{i=1}^n x_i,\qquad G_n=\biggl(\prod_{i=1}^n x_i\biggr)^{1/n}$$

denote the arithmetic and geometric mean, respectively, of x_{1}, . . ., x_{n}, and let

$$A_n':=\frac1n\sum_{i=1}^n (1-x_i),\qquad G_n'=\biggl(\prod_{i=1}^n (1-x_i)\biggr)^{1/n}$$

denote the arithmetic and geometric mean, respectively, of 1 − x_{1}, . . ., 1 − x_{n}. Then the Ky Fan inequality can be written as

$$\frac{G_n}{G_n'}\le\frac{A_n}{A_n'},$$

which shows the similarity to the inequality of arithmetic and geometric means given by G_{n} ≤ A_{n}.

== Generalization with weights ==
If x_{i} ∈ [0,1/2] and γ_{i} ∈ [0,1] for i = 1, . . ., n are real numbers satisfying γ_{1} + . . . + γ_{n} = 1, then

$$\frac{ \prod_{i=1}^n x_i^{\gamma_i} }
{ \prod_{i=1}^n (1-x_i)^{\gamma_i} }
\le
\frac{ \sum_{i=1}^n \gamma_i x_i }
{ \sum_{i=1}^n \gamma_i (1-x_i) }$$

with the convention 0^{0} := 0. Equality holds if and only if either

- γ_{i}x_{i} = 0 for all i = 1, . . ., n or
- all x_{i} > 0 and there exists x ∈ (0,1/2] such that x = x_{i} for all i = 1, . . ., n with γ_{i} > 0.

The classical version corresponds to γ_{i} = 1/n for all i = 1, . . ., n.

== Proof of the generalization ==
Idea: Apply Jensen's inequality to the strictly concave function

$$f(x):= \ln x-\ln(1-x) = \ln\frac x{1-x},\qquad x\in(0,\tfrac12].$$

Detailed proof: (a) If at least one x_{i} is zero, then the left-hand side of the Ky Fan inequality is zero and the inequality is proved. Equality holds if and only if the right-hand side is also zero, which is the case when γ_{i}x_{i} = 0 for all i = 1, . . ., n.

(b) Assume now that all x_{i} > 0. If there is an i with γ_{i} = 0, then the corresponding x_{i} > 0 has no effect on either side of the inequality, hence the i^{th} term can be omitted. Therefore, we may assume that γ_{i} > 0 for all i in the following. If x_{1} = x_{2} = . . . = x_{n}, then equality holds. It remains to show strict inequality if not all x_{i} are equal.

The function f is strictly concave on (0,1/2], because we have for its second derivative

$$f''(x)=-\frac1{x^2}+\frac1{(1-x)^2}<0,\qquad x\in(0,\tfrac12).$$

Using the functional equation for the natural logarithm and Jensen's inequality for the strictly concave f, we obtain that

$$\begin{align}
\ln\frac{ \prod_{i=1}^n x_i^{\gamma_i}}
{ \prod_{i=1}^n (1-x_i)^{\gamma_i} }
&=\ln\prod_{i=1}^n\Bigl(\frac{x_i}{1-x_i}\Bigr)^{\gamma_i}\\
&=\sum_{i=1}^n \gamma_i f(x_i)\\
&<f\biggl(\sum_{i=1}^n \gamma_i x_i\biggr)\\
&=\ln\frac{ \sum_{i=1}^n \gamma_i x_i }
{ \sum_{i=1}^n \gamma_i (1-x_i) },
\end{align}$$

where we used in the last step that the γ_{i} sum to one. Taking the exponential of both sides gives the Ky Fan inequality.
