= Lev M. Bregman =

Soviet mathematician (1941–2023)

- Лев Брэгман
- Born: January 31, 1941; Leningrad, Soviet Union
- Died: February 24, 2023 (aged 82); Beer Sheva, Israel
- Known for: Bregman divergence, Bregman's Theorem

Academic background
- Education: Leningrad University

Academic work
- Institutions: Leningrad University; Ben-Gurion University of the Negev

Lev Meerovich Bregman (Russian: Лев Меерович Брэгман; 3 January 1941 – 24 February 2023) was a Soviet and Israeli mathematician, most known for the Bregman divergence named after him.

== Education and career ==
Bregman received his M. Sc. in mathematics in 1963 at Leningrad University and his Ph.D. in mathematics in 1966 at the same institution, under the direction of his advisor Iosif V. Romanovsky, for his thesis about relaxation methods for finding a common point of convex sets, which led to one of his most well-known publications.

From 1966 through 1991, he was senior researcher at the Leningrad University. In 1991, following the dissolution of the Soviet Union, Bregman emigrated to Israel and joined the faculty of mathematics at the Ben-Gurion University of the Negev, where he taught until 2002.

Bregman was employed at the Institute for Industrial Mathematics, Beer Sheva, Israel, after having spent over a decade at Ben-Gurion University of the Negev, Beer-Sheva.

Bregman was a member of the Saint Petersburg Mathematical Society.

== Research ==
Bregman's Theorem, proving a 1963 conjecture of Henryk Minc, gives an upper bound on the permanent of a 0-1 matrix.

Bregman is author of several textbooks and dozens of publications in international journals.
