= Norman Levinson =

American mathematician (1912–1975)

- Born: 11 August 1912; Lynn, Massachusetts, US
- Died: 10 October 1975 (aged 63); Boston, Massachusetts, US
- Education: MIT, University of Cambridge
- Known for: Levinson recursion Levinson's inequality
- Awards: Bôcher Memorial Prize (1953); Chauvenet Prize (1971)
- Scientific career
- Fields: Mathematics
- Thesis: On the Non-Vanishing of a Function
- Doctoral advisor: Norbert Wiener
- Doctoral students: Robert K. Brayton; Violet B. Haas; Raymond Redheffer; Harold S. Shapiro

Norman Levinson (August 11, 1912 in Lynn, Massachusetts – October 10, 1975 in Boston) was an American mathematician. Some of his major contributions were in the study of Fourier transforms, complex analysis, non-linear differential equations, number theory, and signal processing. He worked closely with Norbert Wiener in his early career. He joined the faculty of the Massachusetts Institute of Technology in 1937. In 1954, he was awarded the Bôcher Memorial Prize of the American Mathematical Society and in 1971 the Chauvenet Prize (after winning in 1970 the Lester R. Ford Award) of the Mathematical Association of America for his paper A Motivated Account of an Elementary Proof of the Prime Number Theorem. In 1974 he published a 54-pages long paper, later simplified by Matthew Young to 7 pages, proving that more than a third of the zeros of the Riemann zeta function lie on the critical line, a result later improved to two fifths by Conrey.

He received both his bachelor's degree and his master's degree in electrical engineering from MIT in 1934, where he had studied under Norbert Wiener and took almost all of the graduate-level courses in mathematics. He received the MIT Redfield Proctor Traveling Fellowship to study at the University of Cambridge, with the assurance that MIT would reward him with a PhD upon his return regardless of whatever he produced at Cambridge. Within the first four months in Cambridge, he had already produced two papers. In 1935, MIT awarded him with the PhD in mathematics.

His death in 1975 was caused by a brain tumor. He was married since 1938; his widow Zipporah died at age 93 in 2009. He had two daughters and four grandchildren. Norman Levinson's doctoral students include Raymond Redheffer and Harold Shapiro.

== See also ==
- Levinson recursion
- Levinson's inequality
- Levinson's theorem

== Publications ==
- Levinson, Norman (1940), Gap and density theorems (AMS Colloquium Publications vol. 26), New York: Amer. Math. Soc. ISBN 0-8218-1026-X
- Coddington, Earl A.; Levinson, Norman (1955), Theory of ordinary differential equations, McGraw-Hill Book Company, Inc., New York-Toronto-London, MR 0069338 ISBN 978-0-89874-755-3
- Levinson, Norman (1998), Nohel, John A.; Sattinger, David H. (eds.), Selected papers of Norman Levinson. Vol. 1, Contemporary Mathematicians, Boston, MA: Birkhäuser Boston, ISBN 978-0-8176-3862-7, MR 1491093
- Levinson, Norman (1998), Nohel, John A.; Sattinger, David H. (eds.), Selected papers of Norman Levinson. Vol. 2, Contemporary Mathematicians, Boston, MA: Birkhäuser Boston, ISBN 978-0-8176-3979-2, MR 1491093
