= Levinson's inequality =

Mathematical formula

In mathematics, Levinson's inequality is the following inequality, due to Norman Levinson, involving positive numbers. Let $a>0$ and let $f$ be a given function having a third derivative on the range $(0,2a)$, and such that

$$f'''(x)\geq 0$$

for all $x\in (0,2a)$. Suppose $0<x_i\leq a$ and $0<p_i$ for $i = 1, \ldots, n$. Then

$$\frac{\sum_{i=1}^np_i f(x_i)}{\sum_{i=1}^np_i}-f\left(\frac{\sum_{i=1}^np_ix_i}{\sum_{i=1}^np_i}\right)\le\frac{\sum_{i=1}^np_if(2a-x_i)}{\sum_{i=1}^np_i}-f\left(\frac{\sum_{i=1}^np_i(2a-x_i)}{\sum_{i=1}^np_i}\right).$$

The Ky Fan inequality is the special case of Levinson's inequality, where

$$p_i=1,\  a=\frac{1}{2}, \text{ and } f(x) = \log x.$$
