= Ky Fan inequality (game theory) =

In game theory, the Ky Fan inequality or Ky Fan minimax inequality is a result used to establish the existence of equilibria in various games, particularly in economics and mathematical analysis. It was introduced in Ky Fan's 1972 paper, "A minimax inequality and its applications", and is closely related to the Brouwer fixed-point theorem, though often more convenient for proving equilibrium results.

The inequality applies to functions defined on compact, convex subsets of vector spaces and provides a condition under which a minimax-type inequality holds. It is frequently used in the analysis of non-cooperative games, variational inequalities, and general equilibrium models.

== Statement ==
Let $E$ be a convex compact subset of a Hilbert space, and let $f : E \times E \rightarrow \mathbb{R}$ be a function satisfying: For every $y \in E$, the function $x \mapsto f(x, y)$ is lower semicontinuous.

For every $x \in E$, the function $y \mapsto f(x, y)$ is concave.

Then there exists $e \in E$ such that:

$\sup_{y \in E} f(e, y) \leq \sup_{y \in E} f(y, y).$

This result generalizes the classic minimax theorem and is a key tool in fixed-point and equilibrium analysis.
