= Newman's conjecture =

Unsolved problem in mathematics

- Type: conjecture
- Field: analytic number theory
- Conjectured by: Morris Newman
- Conjectured in: 25 March 1960
- Open problem: Yes
- Known cases: Prime powers except powers of 2 or powers of 3, plus selected other numbers (e.g. 16, 40, 65)
- Consequences: Erdős-Ivić conjecture

Unsolved problem in mathematics
Given arbitrary m, r, are there infinitely many values of n such that the partition function at n is congruent to r mod m?
More unsolved problems in mathematics

In mathematics, specifically in number theory, Newman's conjecture is a conjecture about the behavior of the partition function modulo any integer. Specifically, it states that for any integers m and r such that $0 \le r \le m-1$, the value of the partition function $p(n)$ satisfies the congruence $p(n) \equiv r \pmod{m}$ for infinitely many non-negative integers n. It was formulated by mathematician Morris Newman in 1960. It is unsolved as of 2026.

== History ==
Oddmund Kolberg was probably the first to prove a related result, namely that the partition function takes both even and odd values infinitely often. The proof employed was of elementary nature and easily accessible, and was proposed as an exercise by Newman in the American Mathematical Monthly.

1 year later, in 1960, Newman proposed the conjecture and proved the cases m=5 and 13 in his original paper, and m=65 two years later.

Ken Ono, an American mathematician, made further advances by exhibiting sufficient conditions for the conjecture to hold for prime m. He first showed that Newman's conjecture holds for prime m if for each r between 0 and m−1, there exists a nonnegative integer n such that the following holds:

- $24 \mid mn+1$
- $p \left(\frac{mn+1}{24} \right) \equiv r \pmod{m}$

He used the result, together with a computer program, to prove the conjecture for all primes less than 1000, except 3. Ahlgren expanded on his result to show that Ono's condition is, in fact, true for all composite numbers coprime to 6.

Three years later, Ono showed that for every prime m greater than 3, one of the following must hold:

- Newman's conjecture holds for m, or
- $m\mid p(mn+k)$ for all nonnegative integers n, and $1\le k < 24, 24k\equiv 1 \pmod{m}$.

Using a computer, he proved the theorem for all primes less than 200,000, except 3.

Afterwards, Ahlgren and Boylan used Ono's criterion to extend Newman's conjecture to all primes except possibly 3. Two years afterwards, they extended their result to all prime powers except powers of 2 or 3.

== Partial progress and solved cases ==
The weaker statement that $p(n)\equiv 0 \pmod{m}$ has at least 1 solution has been proved for all primes m. It was formerly known as the Erdős–Ivić conjecture, named after mathematicians Paul Erdős and Aleksandar Ivić. It was settled by A. Schinzel.
