= Ky Fan =

Chinese-American mathematician (1914–2010)

- 樊𰋀
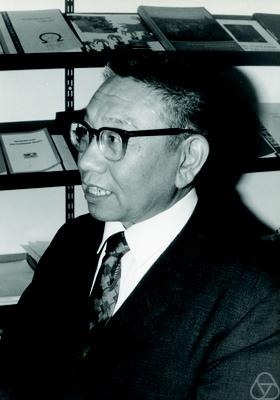
- Born: September 19, 1914; Hangzhou, China
- Died: March 22, 2010 (aged 95); Santa Barbara, California
- Education: Peking University; University of Paris
- Known for: Ky Fan norm Ky Fan lemma Ky Fan inequality
- Scientific career
- Fields: Mathematics
- Workplaces: University of Notre Dame; Northwestern University; University of California, Santa Barbara
- Doctoral advisor: Maurice René Fréchet

Ky Fan (樊𰋀, pinyin: Fán Qí, September 19, 1914 – March 22, 2010) was a Chinese-American mathematician widely regarded as one of the most influential mathematicians from China and one of the greatest mathematicians of the 20th century. Fan's mathematical achievements were unusually versatile and covered numerous areas of mathematics, including both linear and nonlinear analysis, from finite to infinite dimensions, and extends from pure to applied mathematics. He made fundamental contributions in nonlinear analysis, convex analysis and inequalities, fixed point theory, operator and matrix theory, linear and nonlinear programming, complex analysis, topology, and topological groups.

Fan's mathematical research is usually concerned with the foundation and central issues of a field or direction where many of his achievements and results have become classics and found wide applications in many fields, in particular in mathematical economics. For instance, Fan's work in fixed point theory, in addition to influencing nonlinear functional analysis, has found wide applications in mathematical economics and game theory, potential theory, calculus of variations, and differential equations. The basic theorem of the mathematical economics theory of Gérard Debreu, winner of the 1983 Nobel Memorial Prize in Economic Sciences, directly derives from a minimax principle of Fan.

Fan was a doctoral student and collaborator of René Maurice Fréchet at the University of Paris. He was also influenced by John von Neumann and Hermann Weyl. From 1945 to 1947, Fan was a member of the Institute for Advanced Study in Princeton, New Jersey. Fan was elected to the Academia Sinica in 1964 and served as the director of the Institute of Mathematics of Academia Sinica in Taiwan from 1978 to 1984. In 1985, an international mathematical conference was held at UC Santa Barbara to celebrate the retirement of Fan. Many mathematicians from all over the world traveled to Santa Barbara to participate. Mathematical papers presented at the conference were later published in "Nonlinear and Convex Analysis: Proceedings in Honor of Ky Fan". An entire volume of the mathematical journal "Topological Methods in Nonlinear Analysis" was dedicated to Dr. Fan on the occasion of his 80th birthday.

== Biography ==
Fan was born in Hangzhou, the capital of Zhejiang Province, China. His father, named Fan Qi (樊琦, 1879—1947), served in the district courts of Jinhua and Wenzhou. Ky Fan went to Jinhua with his father when he was eight years old and studied at several middle schools in Zhejiang, including the Jinhua High School (currently Jinhua No.1 High School), Hangzhou Zongwen High School (currently Hangzhou No.10 Middle School), and Wenzhou High School. Fan obtained his secondary diploma from the Jinhua High School.

Fan enrolled into Peking University Department of Mathematics in 1932, and received his B.S. degree from Peking University in 1936. Initially Fan wanted to study engineering, but eventually shifted to mathematics, largely because of the influence of his uncle Feng Zuxun (冯祖荀, 1880–1940; b. Hangzhou, d. Beijing), who was a mathematician in China and the then Chair of the Department of Mathematics of Peking University. After graduation, Fan became a teaching assistant in the department.

Fan went to France in 1939 and received his D.Sc. degree from the University of Paris in 1941. Fan's doctoral advisor was M.R.Fréchet. Fan was a research fellow at the French National Centre for Scientific Research (CNRS). During his secondary school and college time, Fan said he "hated English". That was an important reason for him to choose mathematics, with less English but full of equations, and go to Paris.

Fan was a member of the Institute for Advanced Study in Princeton, New Jersey from 1945 to 1947. In 1947, Fan joined the mathematical faculty of the University of Notre Dame, where he was an assistant professor at the beginning, and later promoted to associate professor and full professor. In 1960, Fan also held a position at Wayne State University in Detroit for about one year, but immediately went to Northwestern University near Chicago. In 1965, Fan became a professor of mathematics at UCSB. Fan was known for being an extremely strict professor.

In 1999, Fan and his wife Yan Youfen (燕又芬) donated one million US dollars to the American Mathematical Society, to set up the Ky and Yu-Fen Fan Endowment.

Fan had 23 graduate students. He died in Santa Barbara in March 2010.

His given name 𰋀 is an extremely rare variant of the character 畿, and was only included in Unicode in 2020 as part of CJK Extension G.

== Academic career ==
Fan was the author of approximately 130 papers, Fan made fundamental contributions to operator and matrix theory, convex analysis and inequalities, linear and nonlinear programming, topology and fixed point theory, and topological groups. His work in fixed point theory, in addition to influencing nonlinear functional analysis, has found wide application in mathematical economics and game theory, potential theory, calculus of variations, and differential equations.

The following are named after him:

- Ky Fan norms
- Ky Fan inequality
- Ky Fan inequality (game theory)
- Ky Fan lemma
- Ky Fan metric

== Publications ==
- Sur quelques notions fondamentales de l'analyse générale, 1941
- Introduction à la topologie combinatoire, co-author with M.R.Fréchet, first published in 1946, later translated into English and Spanish.
  - Invitation to combinatorial topology, 2003
- Fonctions définies-positives et les fonctions complètement monotones; leurs applications au calcul des probabilités et à la théorie des espaces distanciés, 1950
