= Pentagonal number =

Figurate number

A visual representation of the first six pentagonal numbers

A pentagonal number is a figurate number that extends the concept of triangular and square numbers to the pentagon, but, unlike the first two, the construction of pentagonal numbers creates a pattern of inside dots that are not rotationally symmetrical. The nth pentagonal number p_{n} is the number of distinct dots in a pattern of dots consisting of the outlines of regular pentagons with sides up to n dots, when the pentagons are overlaid so that they share one vertex. For instance, the third one is formed from outlines comprising 1, 5 and 10 dots, but the 1, and 3 of the 5, coincide with 3 of the 10 – leaving 12 distinct dots, 10 in the form of a pentagon, and 2 inside.

p_{n} is given by the formula:

$$p_n = {\frac{3n^2-n}{2}}=\binom{n}{1}+3\binom{n}{2}$$

for n ≥ 1. The first few pentagonal numbers are:

1, 5, 12, 22, 35, 51, 70, 92, 117, 145, 176, 210, 247, 287, 330, 376, 425, 477, 532, 590, 651, 715, 782, 852, 925, 1001, 1080, 1162, 1247, 1335, 1426, 1520, 1617, 1717, 1820, 1926, 2035, 2147, 2262, 2380, 2501, 2625, 2752, 2882, 3015, 3151, 3290, 3432, 3577, 3725, 3876, 4030, 4187... (sequence A000326 in the OEIS).

The nth pentagonal number is the sum of n integers starting from n (i.e. from n to 2n − 1). The following relationships also hold:

$$p_n = p_{n-1} + 3n - 2 = 2p_{n-1} - p_{n-2} + 3$$

Pentagonal numbers are closely related to triangular numbers. The nth pentagonal number is one third of the (3n − 1)th triangular number. In addition, where T_{n} is the nth triangular number:

$$p_n = T_{n-1} + n^2 = T_n + 2T_{n-1} = T_{2n-1} - T_{n-1}$$

Generalized pentagonal numbers are obtained from the formula given above, but with n taking values in the sequence 0, 1, −1, 2, −2, 3, −3, 4..., producing the sequence:

0, 1, 2, 5, 7, 12, 15, 22, 26, 35, 40, 51, 57, 70, 77, 92, 100, 117, 126, 145, 155, 176, 187, 210, 222, 247, 260, 287, 301, 330, 345, 376, 392, 425, 442, 477, 495, 532, 551, 590, 610, 651, 672, 715, 737, 782, 805, 852, 876, 925, 950, 1001, 1027, 1080, 1107, 1162, 1190, 1247, 1276, 1335... (sequence A001318 in the OEIS).

Generalized pentagonal numbers are important to Euler's theory of integer partitions, as expressed in his pentagonal number theorem.

The number of dots inside the outermost pentagon of a pattern forming a pentagonal number is itself a generalized pentagonal number (sequence A005449 in the OEIS).

== Other properties ==
- $p_n$ for n>0 is the number of different compositions of $n+8$ into n parts that don't include 2 or 3.
- $p_n$ is the sum of the first n natural numbers congruent to 1 mod 3.
- $p_{8n}-p_{8n-1}=p_{2n+2}-p_{2n-2}$

== Generalized pentagonal numbers and centered hexagonal numbers ==
Generalized pentagonal numbers are closely related to centered hexagonal numbers. When the array corresponding to a centered hexagonal number is divided between its middle row and an adjacent row, it appears as the sum of two generalized pentagonal numbers, with the larger piece being a pentagonal number proper:

1=1+0	7=5+2	19=12+7	37=22+15
*	*	*	*

In general:

$$3n(n-1)+1 = \tfrac{1}{2}n(3n-1)+\tfrac{1}{2}(1-n)\bigl(3(1-n)-1\bigr)$$

where both terms on the right are generalized pentagonal numbers and the first term is a pentagonal number proper (n ≥ 1). This division of centered hexagonal arrays gives generalized pentagonal numbers as trapezoidal arrays, which may be interpreted as Ferrers diagrams for their partition. In this way they can be used to prove the pentagonal number theorem referenced above.

Proof without words that the nth pentagonal number can be decomposed into three equal (n-1)th triangular numbers and the number n.

== Sum of reciprocals ==
A formula for the sum of the reciprocals of the pentagonal numbers is given by
$$\sum_{n=1}^{\infty}\frac{2}{n\left(3n-1\right)}=3\ln\left(3\right)-\frac{\pi}{\sqrt{3}}.$$

== Tests for pentagonal numbers ==
Given a positive integer x, to test whether it is a (non-generalized) pentagonal number we can compute

$$n = \frac{\sqrt{24x+1} + 1}{6}.$$

The number x is pentagonal if and only if n is a natural number. In that case x is the nth pentagonal number.

For generalized pentagonal numbers, it is sufficient to just check if 24x + 1 is a perfect square.

For non-generalized pentagonal numbers, in addition to the perfect square test, it is also required to check if

$$\sqrt{24x+1} \equiv 5 \mod 6$$

The mathematical properties of pentagonal numbers ensure that these tests are sufficient for proving or disproving the pentagonality of a number.

== Gnomon ==
The Gnomon of the nth pentagonal number is:

$$p_{n+1}-p_n = 3n+1$$

== Square pentagonal numbers ==
A square pentagonal number is a pentagonal number that is also a perfect square.

The first few are:

0, 1, 9801, 94109401, 903638458801, 8676736387298001, 83314021887196947001, 799981229484128697805801, 7681419682192581869134354401, 73756990988431941623299373152801... (OEIS entry A036353)

== Pentagonal Square Triangular Number ==
In number theory, a pentagonal square triangular number is a positive integer that is simultaneously a pentagonal number, a square number, and a triangular number. This requires solving the following system of Diophantine equations

$$P_n = \frac{n(3n-1)}{2} = T_m = \frac{m(m+1)}{2} = k^2$$

where $P_n$ is the $n$-th pentagonal number, $T_m$ is the $m$-th triangular number, and $k^2$ is a square number.

Solutions to this problem can be found by checking pentagonal triangular numbers against square numbers. Other than the trivial solution of 1, computational searches of the first 9,690 pentagonal triangular numbers have revealed no other square numbers, suggesting that no other pentagonal square triangular numbers exist below this limit.

Although no formal proof has yet appeared in print, work by J. Sillcox between 2003 and 2006 applied results from W. S. Anglin's 1996 paper on simultaneous Pell equations to this problem. Anglin demonstrated that simultaneous Pell equations have exactly 19,900 solutions with $x, y < 10^{20000}$. Sillcox showed that the pentagonal square triangular number problem can be reduced to solving the equation:

$$x^2 - 6y^2 = -5$$

This places the problem within the scope of Anglin's proof. For $x = 1$ and $y = 1$, only the trivial solution exists.

== See also ==
- Hexagonal number
- Triangular number
