= Durfee =

Durfee may refer to:

== Places in the United States ==
- B.M.C. Durfee High School in Fall River, Massachusetts
- B.M.C. Durfee High School (1886 building) in Fall River, Massachusetts
- Bradford Durfee College of Technology in Fall River, Massachusetts
- Durfee Creek in Cook County, Minnesota
- Durfee Hall, a residential dormitory of Yale University
- Durfee House, a historic building in Geneva, New York
- Durfee Mills, a historic mill complex in Fall River, Massachusetts
- Greene–Durfee House, a historic house in Warwick, Rhode Island
- Henry E. Durfee Farmhouse in Southbridge, Massachusetts
- Lafayette–Durfee House in Fall River, Massachusetts
- Mike Durfee State Prison in South Dakota
- Ramsay-Durfee Estatein Los Angeles, California

== Others ==
- Durfee (surname)
- Durfee square, an attribute of an integer partition in mathematics
