= Durfee (surname) =

Durfee is the surname of the following:

- Brian Lee Durfee, American artist and author of The Forgetting Moon
- David Durfee, American politician
- Edmund Durfee (1788–1845), American settler
- I. P. Durfee (born 1838), American state senator
- James Randall Durfee (1897–1977), American judge
- Job Durfee (1790–1847), American politician and jurist from Rhode Island
- M. Eugene Durfee (1885–1941), American architect
- Minta Durfee (1889–1975), American silent film actress
- Nathan B. Durfee (1812–1872), American politician from Rhode Island
- Thomas Durfee (1826–1901), American judge from Rhode Island
- William Pitt Durfee (1855–1941), American mathematician
- Zach Durfee (born 2001), American football player
  - Durfee square, an attribute of an integer partition in mathematics
