= Durfee House =

Coordinates: 42.8589°N 76.98178°W

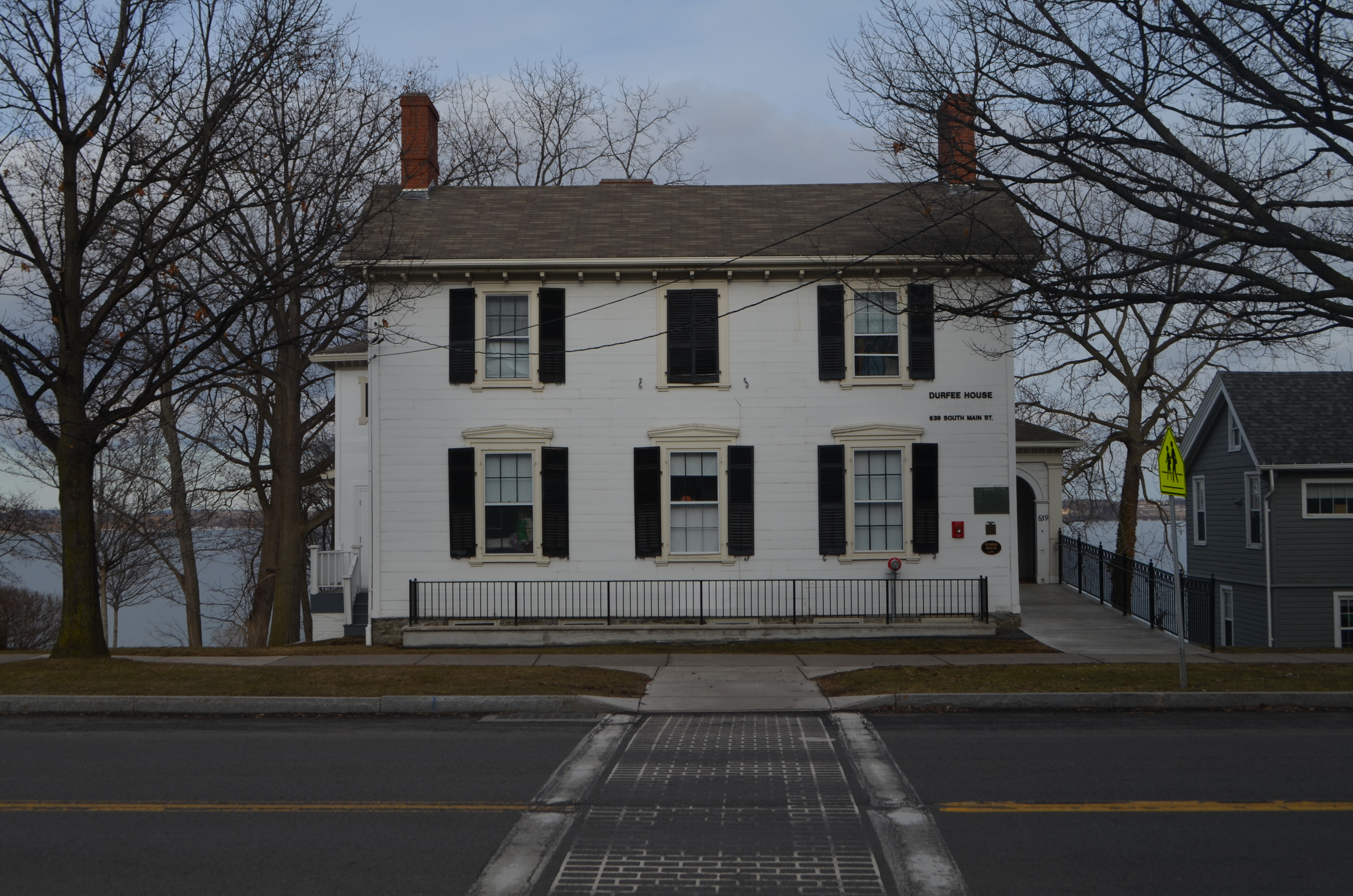
The Durfee House from across Route 14, with Seneca Lake in the background.

The Durfee House is a historic building that now serves as student housing for Hobart and William Smith Colleges in Geneva, New York. It was originally built downtown as a land speculator's office during the nascence of European settlers in the region. Frederick Augustus de Zeng and his family are supposed to be early owners. Dated to 1787, it is the oldest known extant structure in Geneva and the surrounding area; however, the building was moved to its present location at 639 South Main Street in 1838 and expanded at least once in its history, in the late 1790s and/or in the 1840s. This hinders its historical landmark eligibility, despite the fact that it is considered to be one of the oldest extant frame buildings west of Rome, New York. Owned by Hobart College since 1840, the building is named for mathematician and dean William Pitt Durfee.

== See also ==
- Geneva Hall and Trinity Hall, Hobart & William Smith College

== Bibliography ==
- Smith, Warren Hunting (1972). Hobart and William Smith: The History of Two Colleges. Geneva, NY: Hobart and William Smith Colleges. OCLC 409772.
