= Social norms approach =

Strategy in health behavioral science

The social norms approach, or social norms marketing, is an environmental strategy gaining ground in health campaigns. While conducting research in the mid-1980s, two researchers, H.W. Perkins and A.D. Berkowitz, reported that students at a small U.S. college held exaggerated beliefs about the normal frequency and consumption habits of other students with regard to alcohol. These inflated perceptions have been found in many educational institutions, with varying populations and locations. Despite the fact that college drinking is at elevated levels, the perceived amount almost always exceeds actual behavior. The social norms approach has shown signs of countering misperceptions, however research on changes in behavior resulting from changed perceptions varies between mixed to conclusively nonexistent.

== Constructs ==
The social norms approach is founded upon a set of assumptions that individuals incorrectly perceive that the attitudes or behaviors of others are different from their own, when in reality they are similar. This phenomenon is known as pluralistic ignorance. It is largely because individuals assume the most memorable and salient, often extreme, behavior is representative of the behavior of the majority. This may lead individuals to adjust their behavior to that of the presumed majority by adhering to the pseudo-norms created by observing such memorable behavior. These exaggerated perceptions, or rather misperceptions, of peer behavior will continue to influence the habits of the majority, if they are unchallenged. This means that individuals may be more likely to enact problem behaviors and suppress healthier practices, making support for healthy behaviors much less visible at an aggregate level. This effect has been documented for alcohol, illegal drug use, smoking, other health behaviors, and attitudes, such as prejudice.

A phenomenon known as false consensus is closely related to the idea of pluralistic ignorance, and refers to the incorrect belief that others are similar, when in reality they are not. For example, heavy drinkers will think that most others consume as much as they do, and will use this belief to justify their behavior. Berkowitz, an independent consultant who works full-time to promote these ideas, describes false consensus and pluralistic ignorance as "mutually reinforcing and self-perpetuating...the majority is silent because it thinks it is a minority, and the minority is vocal because it believes that it represents the majority" (p. 194).

These phenomena both have the potential to be addressed by a social norms intervention. Berkowitz describes this possibility in relation to reducing alcohol use:

…social norms interventions have been found to be effective in changing the behavior of the moderate or occasional-drinking majority (pluralistic ignorance) as well as confronting and changing the behavior of the heavy drinking minority (false consensus) (p. 9)

Thus, the social norms approach predicts that an intervention which aims to correct misperceptions by exposing actual norms will benefit society as well as individuals, because it will lead people to reduce problem behaviors or increase participation in healthy behaviors. There have been multiple studies which have indeed shown that social norms campaigns can have such positive effects on target populations. One study in particular, which utilized 18 different colleges over a three-year period, found that social norms campaigns were associated with lower perceptions of student drinking and lower consumption levels. Oddly, when the results of this same study were reported at a conference of alcohol educators, DeJong reported that alcohol consumption increased' among both control participants and among the experimental group (those who got the social norms marketing treatment). This discrepancy in reported findings between a conference paper and published journal paper is difficult to reconcile.

Another intervention designed to reduce drinking amongst student athletes had similar results, reducing misperceptions of alcohol consumption. Also, within the time period of the intervention, there were declines in personal consumption, high risk drinking, and alcohol-related consequences. When critiquing this study, one should ask how many dependent variables were assessed, as this group of researchers often assesses as many as 20 or more outcome variables and finds change in 2 or 3 and calls the program successful.

A recent trial of a live, interactive, normative feedback program in which students used keypads to input information had positive effects in terms of reducing misperceptions and drinking behavior. There are many other examples of successful social norms campaigns, which cover various topics, population sizes, and media through which normative messages are conveyed.

=== Types of norms ===
Two types of norms are relevant to a social norms approach: injunctive norms and descriptive norms:

- Injunctive norms reflect people's perceptions of what behaviors are approved or disapproved by others. They assist an individual in determining what is acceptable and unacceptable social behavior.
- Descriptive norms involve perceptions of which behaviors are typically performed. They normally refer to the perception of others' behavior. These norms are based on observations of those around you.

In other words, injunctive norms represent what we think other people approve or disapprove of; descriptive norms represent how people actually behave, regardless of whether the behavior is approved or disapproved. For example, an injunctive norm that almost all people share is that littering is wrong, however, there are still plenty of cases in which people litter.

"Both kinds of norms motivate human action; people tend to do what is socially approved as well as what is popular. (105) When put together, these norms have a counterproductive effect. For example a campaign that focuses individuals on the frequent occurrences of an offense against the environment has the potential to increase the occurrence of that offense". These two norms are constructed from three sources: observable behavior, direct/indirect communication and self-knowledge. Miller and Prentice 1996

- Observable behavior: Observing others behavior is the easiest form of norm information. However it is susceptible to the fundamental attribution error. The fundamental attribution error is the tendency of individuals to view others' behavior as a trait rather than a factor influenced by situational variables (Ross 1997)
- Direct/Indirect: " direct (what words mean) and indirect (what words imply) communication, also has its flaws. Information may be distorted intentionally or unintentionally." (Ross 1997)
- Self: Personal attitudes and behaviors also have an influence over the perception of norms However it is highly susceptible to "the false consensus effect"
- The false consensus effect is when a person thinks that others think and act as they do. (Mullen and Hu)
- These different sources of information about norms can sometimes lead to inaccurate perceptions about other's behaviors and attitudes (Miller and Prentice 1996)

Borsari and Carey'smeta-analysis of studies showed that people misperceive injunctive norms more than they do descriptive norms, and that injunctive norms are more likely to predict drinking behavior and negative consequences of drinking. However, the use of both in social norms campaigns has shown that it is unclear which type of norm is more likely to change behavior.

=== Assumptions ===
There are seven assumptions of the social norms approach:

- Actions are often based on misinformation about or misperceptions of others' attitudes and/or behavior.
- When misperceptions are defined or perceived as real, they have real consequences.
- Individuals passively accept misperceptions rather than actively intervening to change them, hiding from others their true perceptions, feelings, or beliefs.
- The effects of misperceptions are self-perpetuating because they discourage the expression of opinions and actions that are falsely believed to be nonconforming while encouraging problem behaviors that are falsely believed to be normative.
- Appropriate information about the actual norm will encourage individuals to express those beliefs that are consistent with the true, healthier norm, and inhibit problem behaviors that are inconsistent with it.
- Individuals who do not personally engage in the problematic behavior may contribute to the problem by the way in which they talk about the behavior. Misperceptions thus function to strengthen beliefs and values that the "carriers of the misperception" do not themselves hold and contribute to the climate that encourages problem behavior.
- For a norm to be perpetuated it is not necessary for the majority to believe it, but only for the majority to believe that the majority believes it.

== History ==
Since the 1986 study in which Berkowitz and Perkins reported the misperceptions about alcohol consumption amongst college students, the use and study of the social norms approach has grown. It has been used as a prevention technique for a variety of levels of prevention: universal, with large populations like entire college campuses; selective, with targeted subpopulations, and indicated, with individuals.

The first social norms intervention was implemented in 1989 by Michael Haines at Northern Illinois University, which targeted a universal campus population and over the years has shown significant success in terms of increasing healthy behaviors. This research at Northern Illinois University was done with a $64,000 grant from the U.S.Department of Education Fund for the Improvement of Post Secondary Education (FIPSE). Many other universities have since followed suit and have had similar success in the reduction of high-risk drinking behaviors, such as Hobart and William Smith Colleges, the University of Arizona, and University of North Carolina, to name a few.

Since these achievements have become well-known, the social norms approach has been used successfully to reduce smoking, drinking and driving, and HIV risk behaviors, and to increase seat belt use.

It has also gained widespread use targeting adolescents and high school students, and has been used in an attempt to reduce drinking and smoking behaviors amongst those populations. Recently, interventions have been tested to reduce sexual assault, and the results were reported to be "promising".

=== Criticisms ===
The social norms approach is not accepted by all scholars as an effective campaign method. Some criticize the approach by saying that the underlying assumptions are false. One study found that the perceived degree of alcohol use was not predictive of alcohol abuse if other normative influences were considered, and another study found that misperceptions of drinking problems were unrelated to personal alcohol consumption. The findings of both of those studies present opposition to the first assumption of the social norms approach: Actions are often based on misinformation about or misperceptions of others' attitudes and/or behavior.

Other scholars challenge the legitimacy of social norms interventions deemed successful. They say that many of these interventions had methodological problems which could influence the validity of their effectiveness (e.g., they did not control for other variables, did not have comparison groups, etc.). Another common criticism is that they are simply ineffective: a nationwide study, which compared colleges with social norms interventions to those that did not have them, found that schools with interventions showed no decreases in measures of alcohol use, and actually found increased measures in terms of alcohol consumed monthly and total amount consumed. There are also a handful of studies that document failed social norms campaigns at specific colleges.

== Lifecycle ==
A social norms approach determines the exaggerated and actual norms of a population through formative research, and then informs the population of the actual norms through a message campaign. The next step is determining the effectiveness of the messages through a summative evaluation. Finally, the results from the evaluative research can also be used to craft new messages to revise the message campaign, and thus the campaign is cyclical. The following provides a more in-depth description of the steps involved in a social norms campaign.

=== Formative evaluation ===
Formative evaluation is the first step in a social norms campaign and consists of surveying the population, as well as message creation based on the survey results. The formative evaluation phase is the time when information regarding perceived norms and actual behaviors is garnered from the audience. In order for a social norms approach to be the appropriate means for intervention, two conditions must first be satisfied:

- There must be misperceptions between actual behavior and perceived behavior – This simply means that there must be a difference between what people do and what they think other people do or believe. This difference must be a misperception in the direction of overestimation of problem behavior. If there is no difference, the social norms approach is not appropriate. A caveat is that there is almost always a difference. Sometimes a more sensitive instrument is necessary to uncover the misperceptions.
- At least half of the population must behave "correctly" – If over half of the population behaves in a way that is contrary to the intervention, a social norms approach is not the best interventional strategy. Because a social norms approach assumes that individuals want to be normal, if most of the individuals (i.e., over 50%) behave in a way that is harmful, a social norms message campaign might encourage the harmful behavior. It is important to ask questions about both descriptive and injunctive norms.

=== Surveying ===
The most effective way to establish the baseline levels of behavior and perceptions is through the use of surveys. Internet surveys, for example, are an often-used method of generating a substantial response rate. They are especially suited for college students because of their familiarity with the technology, the containment of the population (i.e., all are part of a specific community), and the ability of the students to take the survey at their own pace and during the time that works best for them. Not only are web surveys ideal for students, but they are also highly advantageous for researchers. They provide quick turnaround for data analysis, higher response rates, less missing data, and they eliminate interviewer effects. Other possible methods of administering a survey are pencil and paper surveys, phone surveys, or personal interviews.

The following describes a typical and thorough process used to survey a population:

1. Plan
  - Decide what topics will be covered
  - Decide when to administer the survey
  - Develop useful questions
2. Acquire incentives to provide for respondents – There are two different types of incentives: Individual rewards and lottery rewards. Individual rewards are given to every person who completes the survey (e.g., a coupon for a free pizza). Lottery rewards are awarded to individuals at random (e.g., 10 people receive a $50 gift certificate). Individual rewards are more expensive but provide higher response rates.
3. Survey Design
4. Notifying the Sample – Often, a double-barreled method is used:
  - Pre-letter or pre-email notification – A personalized letter notification delivered several days before the survey opens. The letter includes the purpose and goal of the research, when and at what email address they will receive the email notification, how long the survey will be active, access information (IDs, pass codes), what they will get out of it (i.e., incentives), how their privacy will be protected, and contact information for the surveyors.
  - Email notification – This email repeats much of the information of the original letter, but also provides a link for the survey.
  - Reminder – A reminder often mentions previous notifications, sympathizes about why the respondent might not have completed the survey, mentions the importance of the survey, and includes the incentive information again.

=== Creating a campaign ===
After completing data collection, researchers then analyze the data and search for patterns, looking for inconsistencies between actual behavior, attitudes, and perceived norms. When these differences are consistent with the campaign and the majority of students adhere to the beneficial idea, they are then used in the next round of message creation. For example, the data could show that college students report they consumed 0–4 drinks the last time they partied, but they believe that the average student consumed 5 or more drinks. After discovering this statistic, a researcher may craft a message like, "Most students drink 0–4 drinks when they party", to correct the misperceived descriptive norm.

The most important descriptive researchers look for in the data is the 51% or greater statistic, or items where "most" (i.e., over 50%) of the population adheres to the beneficial behavior. These statistics could occur in injunctive norms (i.e., "Most students believe passing out from drinking too much is wrong."), protective/healthy behaviors (i.e., "Most students use a designated driver, even when only having one or two drinks."), or other numerous behaviors.

There are different message components that can be varied, which are experimented with during pre-testing. For example, researchers test different vocabulary (e.g., "66%" vs. "Most" vs. "Majority), using different behaviors to find out which ones are the easiest and most acceptable to perform (e.g., "eating while drinking" vs. "keeping track while drinking"), and using varying degrees of citations (e.g., large citations vs. small citations of data source). These preliminary messages are pretested on small groups in order to refine them before they are presented to the entire population. Other aspects examined in pretesting include which messages are most socially acceptable, which are believed to be the most effective, and which messages have the highest believability.

==== Believability ====
Believability is a necessary but not a sufficient condition for an effective campaign. If believability of messages is low, change will probably not occur because the persuasive messages are falling into the audience's latitude of rejection. In other words, the audience will reject the message without even considering it. It is also important to note, however, that if believability is extremely high (e.g., over 90%), change is also unlikely to occur because the message is not challenging enough. In other words, it serves only as a reinforcement rather than an element of change. Thus, while there are no specific guidelines, it is ideal to aim for believability above 50%.

In an assessment of the believability of a social norms campaign, Polonec, Major, and Atwood found that students' own drinking experiences and the experiences of their friends contributed to disbelief in the message "Most students on campus choose to have 0 to 4 drinks when they party." Another study found that disbelief may be due to preconceived notions about drinking that students develop even before they arrive on campus.

=== Evaluation ===
After implementing a campaign, researchers then perform a summative evaluation which measures the success of the campaign. This step consists of examining and evaluating the progress made by an intervention through assessing the outcome and impact, cost and benefits, and cost effectiveness of a program. It is typical for researchers to use surveys similar to those used in formative evaluation. The following are questions that a summative evaluation can answer:

- Did change occur in perceptions? A social norms approach is based on correcting misperceptions before changing behavior. The changes in behavior are thought to occur as an outcome of corrected perceptions. The goal is thus for the population to understand the prevalent behavior so they do not feel they have to live up to misperceived norms of behavior. If there is a reduction in misperceptions, then the campaign has been implemented in a manner consistent with the social norms approach.
- How much change occurred? Is the difference significant or is it equally likely to have been caused by chance?
- Is the change associated with the intervention? Are the changes observed the result of some other factor or is there reason to believe the program was the basis for the change? This question can be answered by comparing the results with nationwide averages.
- How much did it cost? This is a method of weighing the benefits achieved by a program against its cost.

An especially important part of summative evaluation is the assessment of market saturation and reach. Clearly, if a social norms campaign does not reach very much of its intended audience, then its potential effectiveness decreases. If researchers can demonstrate that their campaign had high reach, then that strengthens the connection of the intervention to positive outcomes. It also lets researchers know what methods are effective for distributing the campaign. It is necessary for an audience to be exposed to campaign messages frequently to change misperceptions. However, overexposure is possible, leading to a loss of credibility and habituation. Thus, it is important to determine the proper dosage of the campaign in order to achieve maximum effectiveness. Silk et al. provide a comprehensive evaluation of a socials norms campaign related to mental health among college students, revealing positive outcomes for students who were exposed to the social norms campaign (e.g., greater likelihood to visit the university's counseling center).

Once the evaluation is complete, it has the potential to help the intervention. Summative evaluation not only tells whether a program is working, but it can also feed new messages and new campaigns by providing new, updated data.

== Glossary ==
The following are key terms relevant to the social norms approach:

- Pluralistic ignorance: the false assumption of an individual that the attitudes or behaviors of others are different from their own, when in fact they are similar.
- False consensus: the incorrect belief that others are similar to oneself, when in fact they are not.
- Norms: a pattern or trait taken to be typical of the behavior of a social group.
- Descriptive norms: Descriptive norms are concerned with what people actually do. They refer to the perceptions of "the most common actions actually exhibited in a social group," (p. 165) such as the quantity and frequency of drinking, and are largely formed from observations of others' alcohol consumption. Park and Smith found that descriptive norms can be perceived at both a personal and societal level, and define them as "individuals' beliefs regarding the popularity of the behavior in question", (p. 196)either among valued others or society at large.
- Injunctive norms: Injunctive norms are concerned with what people feel is right based on morals or beliefs. Perkins defines them as "widely shared beliefs or expectations in a social group about how people in general or members of the group ought to behave in various circumstances" (p. 165). Park and Smith note that injunctive norms can also be perceived at a personal or a societal level, defining them as "individuals' beliefs regarding approval or disapproval of the behavior in question", (p. 196) either by valued others or societal members.
- Formative evaluation: The first step in a social norms campaign, which consists of surveying the population, as well as message creation based on the survey results. The formative evaluation phase is the time when information regarding perceived norms and actual behaviors is garnered from the audience.
- Summative evaluation: The final step in a social norms campaign before the cycle begins again, which measures its success. It consists of examining and evaluating the progress made by an intervention through assessing the outcome and impact, cost and benefits, and cost effectiveness of a program.

== See also ==
- Peer pressure
