= Geneva Hall and Trinity Hall, Hobart & William Smith College =

- U.S. National Register of Historic Places
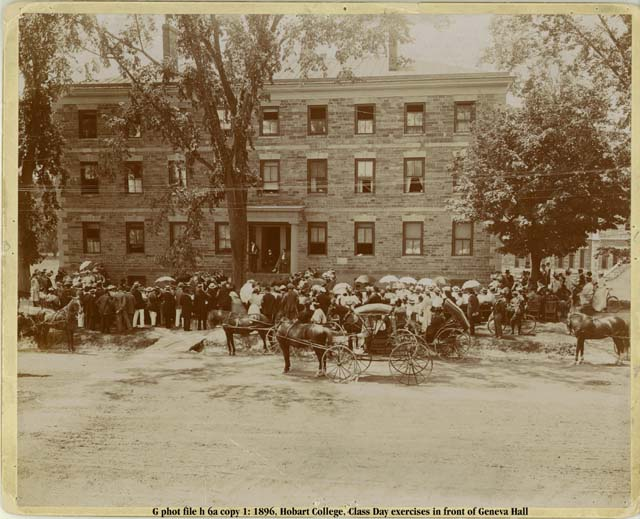
- Geneva Hall in 1896

- Location within New York Location within the United States
- Location: S. Main St., Geneva, New York
- Coordinates: 42°51′30″N 76°58′56″W
- Area: less than one acre
- Built: 1822
- Architect: Hale, Benjamin
- NRHP reference No.: 73001241
- Added to NRHP: July 16, 1973

Geneva Hall and Trinity Hall are historic dormitory buildings located at Hobart & William Smith College in Geneva, Ontario County, New York. Geneva Hall (1822) and Trinity Hall (1837) are the two oldest main structures on the campus of Hobart and William Smith Colleges, however, many of the houses date from earlier and Durfee House is the oldest, dating from the 1780s. Both are three story, nine bay structures built of fieldstone with belt courses between the stories.

They were listed on the National Register of Historic Places in 1973.
