= H. Wesley Perkins =

Sociologist

Education
- Education: Purdue University (B.A.) Yale University Divinity School (M.Div.) Yale University (M.A., Ph.D.)

Philosophical work
- School: social norms approach
- Institutions: Hobart and William Smith Colleges

H. Wesley Perkins (born c. 1950) is a professor of sociology at Hobart and William Smith Colleges in Geneva, New York. He is known as the "father of social norms marketing", which is based on his theoretical formulations and development. H. Wesley Perkins received a B.A. in sociology from Purdue University, an M.Div. degree from Yale University Divinity School, and an M.A. and a Ph.D. in sociology from Yale University.

The social norms marketing approach is widely used to reduce alcohol consumption and abuse among college and university students. Perkins continues to develop and test new techniques to implement the approach as well as to expand its applicability to other social problems. He conducts extensive research, and the most recent book for which he served as editor is The Social Norms Approach to Preventing School and College Age Substance Abuse.

== Cited in the News ==
H. Wesley Perkins's work on the social norms approach has been widely cited in news publications in both the United States and Europe and implemented in government policy around the globe. His work has informed organization-wide interventions to reduce alcohol and substance abuse, the prevalence of bullying, and instances of sexual violence.

== Publications & Conference Presentations ==
Perkins has lectured and presented at forums focusing on alcohol abuse, drug abuse, and bullying prevention. He frequently consults with school administrators, teachers, and those that engage in youth harm reduction to implement and sustain strategies rooted in the social norms approach.

- The Social Norms Approach to Preventing School and College Age Substance Abuse: A Handbook for Educators, Counselors, and Clinicians (Jossey-Bass, 2003).

== Awards and honors ==
- Outstanding Service Award given by the Network of Colleges and Universities Committed to the Elimination of Alcohol and Other Drug Abuse, 1999. This national award is given to the person who has made a significant career contribution to prevention work in higher education at both the local and national level. The person is selected in a vote by network members from among yearly nominees.
- U.S. Department of Education "Model Programs in Higher Education", 2005. Received award as Project Director of Alcohol Education Project for the development of a program with demonstrated effectiveness in prevention of alcohol abuse among college student-athletes at Hobart and William Smith Colleges. This is the second time the award was given to the Project under Perkins’ direction.
- Community Collaboration Award, 2016. Given by Success for Geneva's Children, a Geneva, New York organization dedicated to mobilizing the community to improve the health and well-being of local children and their families. The annual award was given to Perkins in recognition of his significant work over the last ten years to enhance the community understanding of local youth by providing professional guidance in preparing multiple data books on the health and well-being of the city's children. The data books comprising facts and figures drawn from local, regional and national sources and data bases compare social and demographic information regarding Geneva and its children with that of the wider county and state and are recognized to have helped procure almost 4 million dollars in grant funding for local needs.
