= Janet Seeley =

American physical educator

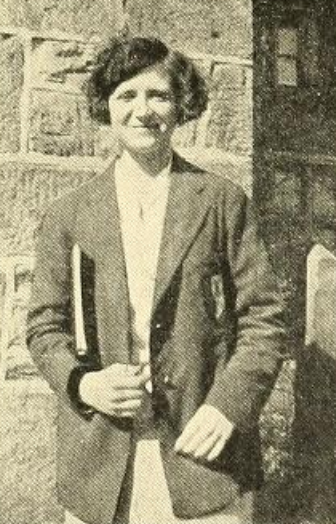
- Janet Seeley, from the 1927 yearbook of Bryn Mawr College
- Born: June 2, 1905
- Died: December 20, 1987 (aged 82)
- Occupation(s): College physical education professor, dance educator
- Relatives: Frederick Townsend Martin (great-uncle); Bradley Martin (great-uncle)

Janet Seeley (June 2, 1905 – December 20, 1987) was an American college professor. She was a member of the faculty at William Smith College from 1932 to 1971, and was director of the school's physical education department and dance program. A gymnasium on campus, and two scholarships, are named for Seeley.

== Early life and education ==
Janet Seeley was born in Connecticut and raised in Rye, New York, the eldest daughter of Frank Earle Seeley and Mabel Martin Seeley. Philanthropist Frederick Townsend Martin and socialite Bradley Martin were her mother's uncles. She graduated from Bryn Mawr College in 1927, and earned a master's degree from Teachers College, Columbia University in 1932. At Bryn Mawr she was president of the school's athletic association, and a member of the school's field hockey team. She also trained as a dancer, at the Bennington School of Dance and the Elizabeth Duncan School of Dance in Munich, and with Martha Graham; she earned a teaching certificate in dance in 1939.

== Career ==
After college, Seeley coached field hockey at Bryn Mawr. She joined the faculty of William Smith College in 1932, and remained there until she retired in 1971. She taught dance courses, directed and choreographed shows for the school's dance club and chaired the physical education department. She experimented with playing recorded music during exercise and sports, as when she played waltz music during badminton practice.

== Personal life and legacy ==
Seeley lived with her colleague Marcia Winn. Seeley died in 1987, at the age of 82. The Winn-Seeley Gymnasium at Hobart and William Smith Colleges was named for the pair in 1970. In 1975, she and two of her siblings inherited the estate of their cousin, Elizabeth Sterling Seeley. In 1997 both Winn and Seeley were inducted posthumously into the Hobart and William Smith Colleges Athletics Hall of Fame. The college also awards a Janet Seeley Performing Arts Scholarship "for performance and/or choreography". The college's Winn-Seeley Award is presented to the outstanding senior woman athlete.
