= Benjamin Fish Austin =

Nineteenth-century Canadian educator, Methodist minister, and spiritualist

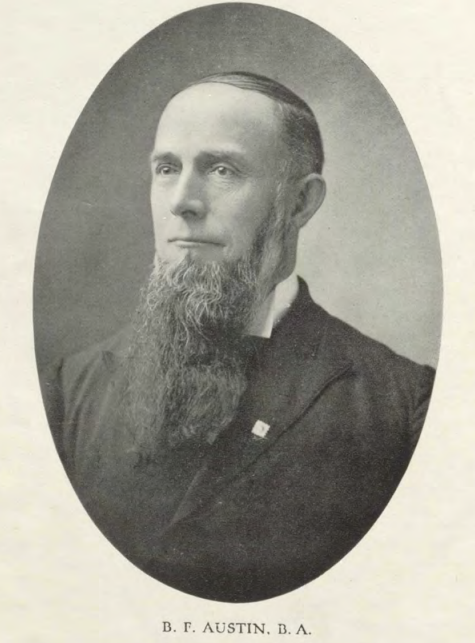
- Born: September 10, 1850; Brighton, Ontario, Canada
- Died: January 22, 1933 (aged 82)

Benjamin Fish Austin (September 10, 1850 – January 22, 1933) was a Canadian educator, author, Methodist minister, and spiritualist. He served as the principal of Alma College girls' school from 1881 to 1897 during which time that institution was regarded as one of the most prestigious centres of female education in Canada. Austin served the Methodist Church for many years as an educator and minister but was expelled from that organisation in 1899 for being a proponent of the Spiritualist movement. He went on to become a renowned spiritualist in Canada and the United States, publishing many books and editing the Rochester and later Los Angeles-based spiritualist magazine Reason.

== Early life and education ==
Austin was born in Brighton, Ontario, the son of another Benjamin Fish Austin and Mary Anne F. McGuire. He was described as a Canadian of mixed English and Irish ethnicity. Benjamin was raised a Methodist, the fourth generation of his family to belong to that church. He attended the local grammar school and worked as a teacher from the age of 16 to 20. At the age of 20, Austin began preaching locally and became more involved with the church, eventually attending Albert College in nearby Belleville, Ontario where he obtained B.A. in theology and received a first class honours in Oriental literature and languages in 1877. He continued on at the college and was awarded a B.D degree in 1881. During his time at Albert College, Austin was the president of the school's temperance union.

Albert College was joined with Victoria College in 1884, forming Victoria University, from which Austin received a D.D. degree in 1896. He was also as of that year a senator of Victoria University. That same year Victoria University became federated within the University of Toronto, so all of Austin's Alma Maters are now existent as federated parts of the modern-day University of Toronto.

== Family ==
Austin married Francis 'Amanda' Connell-Austin (August 12 18-- – August 15, 1928) of Prescott, Ontario, on June 16, 1881. She kept a scrap-book of family events and memories from 1881 to 1917 which is now part of the collection of the archives of the United Church of Canada/Victoria University. While a scrapbook kept by Amanda is an important existent source of information about Austin's life, very little information remains about Amanda herself.

The couple had four children, all born while Austin was principal at Alma College.

Albert Edward Austin (September 20, 1882 – November 19, 1918) died of influenza-pneumonia in San Bernardino, California, where he had been involved in the newspaper trade since moving from Rochester.

Alma H. Austin received a B.A in philosophy from the University of Rochester in 1911. She taught at the Western New York Institute for Deaf Mutes. Alma Austin outlived her father and her mother, and came into possession of their papers and files. During this period she erased her own date of birth from all currently existent archival sources. Only the order of entries into a family scrapbook indicates that she was born between her brother Albert and her sister Beatrice.

Beatrice Evelyn Austin (February 27, 1888 – October 10, 1927) was associate editor of Reason. She was a strong proponent of the League of Nations and was greatly displeased when the United States declined to take part in that organisation. She was an 'earnest student' of metaphysical healing and during President Wilson's illness she organised a group of over 100 healers to work on a united effort to save the man she referred to as 'the emancipator'. She led a Spartan life and was uninterested in physical things. Her father wrote in her obituary that 'None knew her but to love her'.

Austin's youngest daughter, Kathleen Dell Austin, died before her third birthday (September 9, 1893 – April 19, 1896). This sort of tragedy was not uncommon at the time, even among the wealthier middle classes.

== Methodist preacher ==
In 1881 Austin was made the minister at Ottawa's Metropolitan Methodist Church, which was at that time one of the largest congregations in the country. Later in the 1880s he is known to have been a preacher in his wife Amanda's hometown of Prescott, Ontario. While continuing literary work in Toronto he gave at least one sermon at Parkdale Methodist Church.

== Principal of Alma College ==
The first stone of Alma College was laid in St. Thomas, Ontario by the Honourable Adam Crooks, Ontario Minister for Education on 2 May 1878 The college was meant to be a highly academic Methodist school for young ladies. Austin was made the principal of the school upon its opening in 1881. He encouraged his students to think of themselves as ‘’man’s peers’’. He had been heavily involved in the planning and organisational work which had been done during construction The school started out with only six teachers, but it grew under Austin's guidance and would eventually have 20 professors and over 200 students.

In the late 1890s the college was prestigious enough to be visited by John Campbell Hamilton-Gordon, 1st Marquess of Aberdeen and Temair, KT, GCMG, GCVO, PC who was at that time the Governor-General of Canada. The Governor-General arrived at St. Thomas' train station and was followed to Alma College by a crowd of cheering towns-people. He complemented the college's reputation and said to the faculty that, "We all appreciate the important and arduous duties you are called upon to perform". While the inhabitants of the town and the students of the college were greatly pleased by His Excellency's visit, the event was not without problems. The Honourable George E. Casey, M.P. who was to accompany Lord Aberdeen from Ottawa accidentally got off the train at the wrong stop. The train itself was 2 hours late. In addition His Excellency brought neither the medal he was to present to Flora Ferguson for 'general proficiency', nor his wife who was to have been honoured by the students as an example of a fine and educated lady.

Austin was principal of the school for almost 20 years. He was by all accounts much loved by the students and the greater community. His wife Amanda became a great role-model to the girls and was active in the town's social life. The Reverend resigned, however, from his position as principal in May 1897 so as to continue his literary activities in Toronto.

== Expulsion from the Methodist Church ==
From 1897 to 1899 Austin lived in Toronto and devoted himself to his literary works. He also became more and more interested in the growing Spiritualist movement. Spiritualists believe in the scientific validity of many 'supernatural' phenomena (such as communication with the deceased) and occasionally call for Christianity to be reformed and re-examined to remove what they see as many archaic and illiberal principles. As he continued this period of philosophical re-examination, Austin began giving sermons that deviated more and more from accepted teachings.

In June 1899 Austin was tried and expelled from the Methodist Church that he had served all his life. Only three years earlier he had been given a doctorate of divinity from Victoria University in recognition of his services to the Church.

On May 27, 1899, one of Austin's more heterodox sermons was reprinted in the Manitoba Morning Free Press. The speech had originally been given at the Parkdale Methodist Church of Toronto on January 8 of that year. The speech was a fiery and impassioned call for people to seek Truth for themselves. It was critical of church policy and praised independent thought and inquiry. It equated Truth with God and said it was all good Christians' duty to seek out truth, even if the Truth conflicts with official dogma. Austin also criticized the churchmen of his time for being too closed-minded in their view of new theories, such as Spiritualism. (Many excerpts from this sermon are available on wikiquote)

The Methodist hierarchy was not pleased, and asked Austin to withdraw his comments. He refused.

The Rev. A. H. Goring of Port Stanley argued that the sermon constituted heresy on four counts;

- It denied the doctrine of eternal punishment
- It questioned the divinity of Jesus of Nazareth
- It denied that Jesus was God's last revelation to man
- It upheld a fraudulent system of spiritualism

Austin said that he was unable to attend a trial, and he submitted a written defence. In his defence he denied the first 3 charges categorically and defended his comments on spiritualism to be relating only to "a true spiritualism". He took particular affront to the third charge, writing that;

I have never heard of this doctrine. I am convinced it is a discovery of the complainant. Fearing my theological teachers may have sadly failed in regard to one important dogma and that I might still be in profound ignorance of some well known scriptural doctrine of Methodism I consulted an eminent authority -whose name would be recognised throughout America- and he does not know of any such dogma in our church or any Christian church."

It was also alleged that Austin had attended a séance with a clairvoyant in Detroit. Austin made no attempt to deny this.

He was found guilty of the later three charges, but appealed the decision to the Methodist annual convention, held that year in June in Windsor, Ontario. At the conference it was widely believed that Austin's reputation alone would acquit him if he distanced himself from his earlier comments and did not make a speech or any sort of commotion. Ignoring this, Austin decided to speak in support of his earlier comments.

He gave a rousing defence of the sermon for three and a half hours. He implored the churchmen he had earlier denounced as closed to new thoughts to recognise the validity of many new beliefs. The age was, "a period of transitions. Old interpretations of the scripture are giving way to new ones. Old conceptions of the method of creation are no longer popular" Rather than surrendering to a "rush" towards atheism and agnosticism Austin wanted the church to slightly modify its interpretation of the scriptures so as to be more modern. He reminded his audience that this would not be the first time that the scriptures had been re-examined and asked that if past generations had been able to interpret the scriptures to fit their times then, "Have we not the right to our own views, and own interpretations, and own creeds, and own Truths equal to those that proceeded us? Must we forever wear the cast-off garments of past ages?"

Austin claimed that "Every man has an inherent right to know all that can be known about Humanity", and said that since the faculty of reason is a gift from God, to silence a man's thoughts is to question the wisdom of the Creator who endowed him with that reason. We are, he argued, made to question and challenge what we hear. This time of questioning, furthermore, would not weaken the Church but strengthen it. "It is time for everything that can be shaken to be removed", he said, "that the things that cannot be shaken remain". This process would leave a wiser and truer Methodist Church which held to its firm beliefs will rejecting it's the weaker parts of the faith. This fits with Austin's long-term belief that all religions had beneficial aspects that should be encouraged and negative traits that should be removed. In a later Spiritualist work he would say that in a Spiritualist world each religion should lend and borrow the choice parts of the others.

The most controversial portion of his speech was when he called on the church to accept the 'scientific proof of Spiritualism'. The recognition of a scientific basis for such 'supernatural' events, Austin argued, would make the events of the Bible seem more plausible; drawing many sceptics back into the flock. Austin related how he had himself experienced a variety of Spiritualist phenomena including: sounds produced in metals and woods, the independent movement of chairs, the production of an independent voice, and the de-materialisation of matter (so as to allow the passage of matter through matter).

Austin mentioned in his defence the renowned British inventor Sir William Crookes. Sir William was described as the inventor of the radiometer and the vacuum tube, the discoverer of thallium, a member of the Royal Society, president of the British Association for the Advancement of Science, and (according to Austin) Britain's 3rd most important scientific mind (Lord Kelvin and Wallace taking the first two spots by narrow margins). Sir William had conducted a series of experiments with noted Spiritualists and Spiritual Mediums and had also experienced many of the phenomena that Austin described, admitting them to be beyond any known natural law. These experiences had occurred during a series of highly controlled tests in Sir William's own house and in other places which could not have been tampered with.

In defending against the claims by many Christians that Spiritualism (and especially the communication with the spirits of the dead) was an act of devil worship, Austin related a short anecdote. When visiting a prison in Winnipeg, Austin explained, he had once met a prisoner who was incarcerated for shooting a man on a bicycle. The man, "an Indian of low intellect" had never seen a bicycle before and had interpreted the strange and unknown form of a bicycler as a diabolical combination of man and beast, shooting it immediately. Austin compared this unthinking action to the ignorant conclusion by many Christians unacquainted with Spiritualism that Spiritual communication was some sort of demonic ritual. He concluded the argument by saying that "Let no one then… think for a moment to satisfy the intelligence of this age by the flippant statement of ignorant bigotry 'it's all the devil'.

Near the end of his address Austin asked the conference to consider the implications if they were wrong in their decisions. If he himself were wrong in promoting Spiritualism he was after all only be one man who easily could be ignored, but if the Methodist Church was wrong in suppressing a valid philosophy the entire organisation would have committed a grave error. Since the risk of one man being wrong was less grave than the risk of an entire organisation using its power unjustly he asked the conference to show restraint.

Finally he threatened the conference by reminding them that he had many supporters and that "this conference is before the bar of public opinion and if it pronounces a judgement out of harmony with the individual liberty and liberal sentiment of the age… then the conference will not, cannot escape public condemnation". While the public's reaction to the trial is hard to measure, the issue was quite controversial. The Sermon Publishing Company or Toronto published, for the price of 25¢, a pamphlet entitled "The heresy trial of Rev. B. F. Austin MA DD ex-principal of Alma College, giving a sketch of Austin's life, story of his heresy trial, copy of the charges, the heresy sermon, the scene at the conference, Austin's full address defending his views on spiritualism at the London annual Conference at Windsor, June First 1899".

In any event Dr Austin's call for a more scientific view of spiritualism and the Bible was not received well. Only one vote kept his expulsion from being unanimous.

== Spiritualism ==
Spiritualism, the religious system that Austin supported, and under whose banner he later worked in Rochester and Los Angeles, was a religious movement with its modern roots in the mid-1840s. The movement continues to this day and the National Spiritualist Association of Churches (which is the modern continuation of an organisation with which Austin had contact) lists the following as its guiding principles.

- 1. We believe in Infinite Intelligence.
- 2. We believe that the phenomena of Nature, both physical and spiritual, are the expression of Infinite Intelligence.
- 3. We affirm that a correct understanding of such expression and living in accordance therewith, constitute true religion.
- 4. We affirm that the existence and personal identity of the individual continue after the change called death.
- 5. We affirm that communication with the so-called dead is a fact, scientifically proven by the phenomena of Spiritualism.
- 6. We believe that the highest morality is contained in the Golden Rule: "Whatsoever ye would that others should do unto you, do ye also unto them."
- 7. We affirm the moral responsibility of individuals, and that we make our own happiness or unhappiness as we obey or disobey Nature's physical and spiritual laws.
- 8. We affirm that the doorway to reformation is never closed against any human soul here or hereafter.
- 9. We affirm that the precepts of Prophecy and Healing are Divine attributes proven through Mediumship.

The movement was formed primarily from the well-educated classes and contained many formerly Christian theologians. Many were driven away from Christianity by that faith's, as they saw it, overly strict application of doctrine and its denial of certain phenomena such as astral projection. It was a large movement and in 1878 the Roman Catholic Diocese of Boston estimated the total number of Spiritualists in the United States to be over 10 million. The exact number was hard to pinpoint, however, there were many levels of Spiritualist belief. Some Spiritualists still saw themselves as devoted Christians while others denounced their former faith in public. All estimates at their total numbers were only approximate.

Austin first became interested in the area of Spiritualism when researching for his paper "Glimpses of the Unseen". When conducting research into the many reported sightings of paranormal events (return of the Spirits of the dead, etc.) Austin became convinced of the veracity of the reports.

In the beginning Austin saw Spiritualism as a renewed and perfected form of Christianity. He saw the acceptance of modern 'miracles' such as those found in séances as a continuation of the miracles of Biblical times. In the sermon for which he was expelled from the Methodist Church Austin said, "Why should inspiration be limited to one past age? If Truth came to Paul 1900 years ago it can come to you today. After all, Heaven is as near to-day, God is as loving and as kind to-day, and truth as abundant to-day, as in the ages when men are said to have possessed inspiration." v If a scientific view could be taken to such experience in the modern age, then a better understanding could be had of God's past revelations to Biblical prophets. Austin also thought that this new view might draw some skeptics who had become atheists for lack of proof of the Divine's interaction with man back to religion. If one could explain a modern séance one could explain how God spoke to the prophets of the Old Testament, and this rational understanding would encourage belief among the skeptical.

In his book The A. B. C. of Spiritualism (published in 1920) he explained many of the movement's ideas and goals. The work is written in the format of a hypothetical dialogue between a Christian and a Spiritualist with the former asking questions of the later. The Spiritualist proceeds to explain his movement's positions on a variety of important issues. When asked if Spiritualism finds any church or creed to be divine the answer is that they are divine in that they rise from man's spiritual nature in wishing to reach towards God. All are attempts to answer important questions. Spiritualism denies, however, that any one system has been able to answer these questions satisfactorily. It does point out that Christianity "is certainly the one perfect and infallible and supernatural religion if there be one". The Christian Bible is, however, only a collection the views of many past men and societies. It may be useful, but it is not perfect.

When asked directly if Spiritualists believe in the divinity of Jesus of Nazareth the book gives a very interesting answer. "Most assuredly", it says, "Spiritualists believe in the divinity of all men. Every man is divine in that he is a child of God and inherits a divinely spiritual nature. We are all 'God made manifest in the flesh'" ix. This view of all people (one can assume that Austin meant 'Men' to be read as 'Humans') as being divine by their existence echoes many modern Humanist teachings.

A 1906 edition of Reason (the Spiritualist magazine published by Austin and his family) contained a section called 100 Conundrums for the Clergy. The work is made up of 100 rhetorical questions asked to "The orthodox Clergy" (by which Austin meant traditionally non-Spiritualist Churches, not Eastern Christians). The 100 conundrums were reprinted in book form later in the year. While some of the questions lead to obvious Spiritualist answers others merely attack the Christian notion that one specific book could be a definitive source of truth so perfect as to be unquestionable. An entire section, for example, centres on the compilation of the Bible in the fourth century;

"16 - Who decided on the Canon of Scripture? Where did the deciders get their authority for rejecting some books and including others? Was the selection process infallibly inspired? What proof can you offer of this?

17 - Was not the First Council of Nicaea convened by Constantine the Great? A man who murdered his father-in-law, cut the throat of his 12-year-old nephew and in the same year he convened the council beheaded his eldest son, and put Fausta his wife to death?

18 - Is the inspiration that would come to a Council presided over by such a monster likely to be 'plenary' and 'divine' and 'infallible'? …

22 - Is it true that there were 50 gospels submitted and only four accepted, and that Luke had a majority of one vote?"

The work is an effort to discredit the mainstream Christian movement. It shows stark contrast to seven years ago, when he had been the head of a Christian school.

While the work may seem to be something of a bitter diatribe against the organisation that ostracized him it should be remembered that Austin referred to Christianity with great respect in many other works. He attacked the religion's blind faith in its own infallibility without ever losing sight of the Church's many beneficial traits. In a 1928 edition of The Austin Pulpit (a sister publication to Reason) he referred to the Bible as being the "First among equals" among religious texts, provided that it is "interpreted rationally". In his 1920 book The ABC of Spiritualism, Austin answered the question of how Spiritualists should relate to the organised Christian church by reminding his readers that Churches have "done good in many ways". He advised his followers to learn from the many centuries that the Christian church has in religious work as "they cannot but have learned some wisdom". He does finish, it must be admitted, by saying that "a frank acknowledgment of the good done by churches makes the way open for a clear statement on their fallacies and falsities" ix. As in all things Austin praised an honest and frank view of the Truth.

== Life in America ==
In 1903 Austin moved to the United States to become the principal of William Smith College for Women in Geneva, New York. Though the college's founder, William Smith, was a well-known Spiritualist the college was officially non-sectarian. That said the school's mission included a wish to raise young women of 'a noble spirituality'. Austin also commented at the school's founding that he hoped that,

"opportunities for psychological research shall be afforded along the lines of the Psychical Research Society of England, namely experiments for the illustration of psychic phenomena and the collection of facts and experience in regard to the powers and possibilities of man's spiritual nature, with a view to finding a rational explanation thereof and of demonstrating, if possible the continuity of life after death and of communion with the spirit realm. Such research, however, must not be compulsory."

The school, it seems, had a not entirely subtle Spiritualist inclination.

Austin was the pastor of the Plymouth Spiritualist Church in Rochester, New York from 1906 to 1911. Austin also became a trustee of the New York State Spiritual Assembly. During his time in New York, Austin became the editor of a Spiritualist magazine called Reason. The magazine became a very widely known and respected voice in Spiritualist circles. Austin's daughter Beatrice Evelyn was the associate editor of the magazine. She was a strong follower of the Spiritualist movement, and was a well-regarded 'healer'. Austin's only son, Albert Edward, was also involved in the magazine. The publication was organised by Austin's own printing company, The Austin Publishing Company Limited, which was a reincarnation of an organisation which Austin had used to publish his sermons in Toronto.

In 1911 Alma H. Austin, Austin's eldest daughter, graduated from the University of Rochester with a degree in Philosophy. She later became a teacher, working at one point at the Western New York Institute for Deaf Mutes.

In 1913 Austin took up a leading position at the Central Spiritual Church of Los Angeles. The entire family moved with him to California and lived in several cities in the Southern part of the state. In California the family continued to publish Reason and also began to put out a sister publication called The Austin Pulpit. This publication, whose subtitle was Jesus' quotation "The Truth Shall Make You Free", carried other Spiritualist works that did not fit into Reason. Both papers were printed by the Austin Publishing Company of Los Angeles. In the June 1928 edition the paper that survives there is story of how the widow of the contortionist Houdini had received through a Spiritualist medium a code-word that she had agreed upon with her husband moments before his death, and a notice from the 'American Committee for the Outlawry of War' calling for all Spiritualists to unite and help the League of Nations end war as a method for solving international disputes.

On November 19, 1918, Albert Edward Austin, Dr. Austin's only son, died of the 'Spanish flu' influenza-pneumonia epidemic while in San Bernardino, California. Albert Edward had been involved in the Californian newspaper market.

On October 10, 1927, Austin's daughter Beatrice Evelyn died after an illness of three years caused by a 'severe fever'. Beatrice spent her last summer with her mother in Alaska's salubrious summer climate. Upon her return to the continental United States she seemed much improved, but did not live out the year. She had been associate editor of Reason for 10 years at the time of her death

In 1928 Austin was a travelling lecturer across much of the continental United States. An edition of The Austin Pulpit advertised that he was making speeches in Phoenix, Oklahoma, and Kansas.

It is known that Amanda Austin was buried in August 1928 in St. Thomas, Ontario, but it is unclear whether she, or any of the rest of the family, had been living in the town at the time. Austin had remarked that he greatly liked St. Thomas and would consider moving back there, but as of June 1928 The Austin Pulpit continued to be published from Los Angeles.

== Political and social views ==
Described as a liberal, Austin was always a very strong proponent of social change to alleviate the condition of the poor in society. In 1884 he published a sermon The Gospel of the Poor vs. Pew Rents, in which he argued that the ability of rich families to reserve specific pews created un-Christian divisions between congregants. He argued that the church should be a place for all people to gather, and reminded the Methodist authorities that Jesus of Nazareth had himself opposed the mal-treatment of the poor.

While Austin denied that he was an anarchist or a socialist "in the sense that most men understand the term" he did admit that a "new social system' was required xiv. It was also written about him that he "Strongly supports the Public ownership of all utilities and of Nature's resources".

In 1890 he wrote a pamphlet that opposed the creation of Jesuit schools. He claimed that the Jesuits were an illiberal group who wished to impose their values onto 'British' (Canadian) society. Enlightened and tolerant British society, in his view, had to stand up for its principles and reject the encroachment of oppressive foreign ideologies.

Perhaps Austin's most important, and most progressive, social views were on the status of women in society. He wrote a book in 1890 called On Woman in which he argued that women should be equal members of society and should never be forced into marriage for economic or social reasons. Austin was the principal of two prestigious colleges for young ladies and viewed the education of women to be of pressing importance. "Christ", he wrote, "has declared Woman's equality with Man" xv.

== Books written or edited ==
- Sermons on Popular Sins (1878)
- M. E Pulpit
- Woman; Her Character Culture or Calling (1890)
- Rational Memory Training (1894)
- Glimpses of the Unseen (1898)
- Gospel to the Poor Versus Pew Rents
- Prohibition Leaders of America
- Woman: Maiden, Wife and Mother (1898)
- What Converted me to Spiritualism: 100 testimonials (1901)
- Conundrums for the Clergy (1906)
- How to Make Money (1913)
- Success and How to Win It (1904)
- The crucifixion and the resurrection of Jesus (1919)

== Newspapers and magazine published ==
- Reason
- The Austin Pulpit
- The Sermon: A Monthly Magazine Devoted to New Theology and Psychic Research
