= William Pitt Durfee =

American mathematician

- Born: February 5, 1855; Livonia, Michigan, US
- Died: December 17, 1941 (aged 86); Geneva, New York, US
- Education: University of Michigan; Johns Hopkins University
- Known for: Durfee square
- Scientific career
- Fields: Mathematics
- Workplaces: Hobart and William Smith Colleges
- Doctoral advisor: James Sylvester

William Pitt Durfee (5 February 1855 – 17 December 1941) was an American mathematician who introduced Durfee squares. He was a student of James Sylvester, and after obtaining his degree in 1883 he became a professor at Hobart college in 1884 and became dean in 1888. Durfee House and Durfee Hall are named in his honor.

== Publications ==
- Durfee, William P. (1900), The elements of plane trigonometry, Ginn & co.
