= Henry E. Durfee Farmhouse =

Historic house in Massachusetts, United States

- U.S. National Register of Historic Places
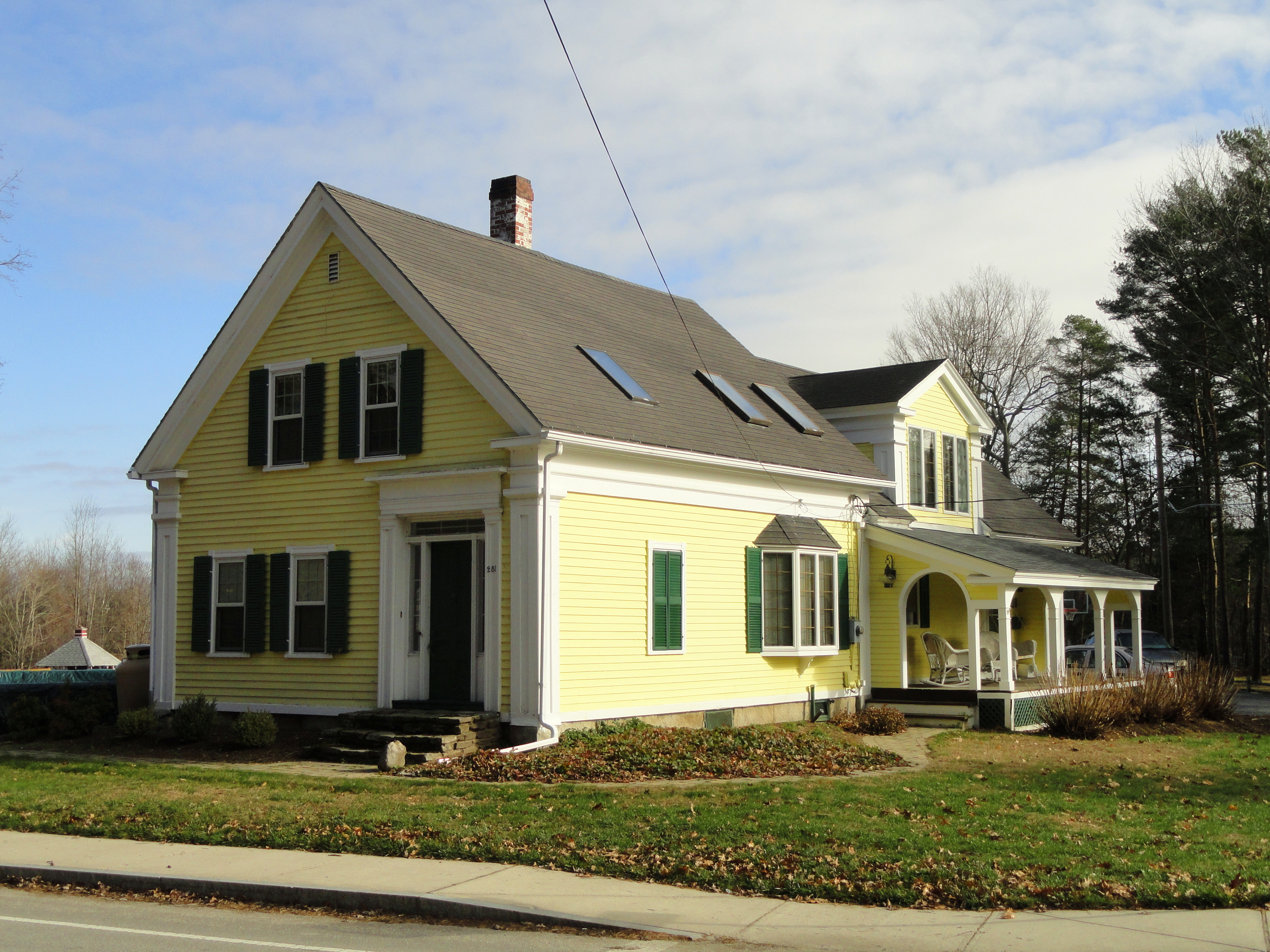

- Location within Massachusetts Location within the United States
- Location: 281 Eastford Rd., Southbridge, Massachusetts
- Coordinates: 42°3′49″N 72°2′33″W
- Area: less than one acre
- Built: c. 1849
- Architectural style: Greek Revival
- MPS: Southbridge MRA
- NRHP reference No.: 89000547
- Added to NRHP: June 22, 1989

The Henry E. Durfee Farmhouse is a historic Greek Revival farm house at 281 Eastford Road in Southbridge, Massachusetts. Built about 1849, it is a good example of Greek Revival architecture, and a reminder of the now suburban area's once agricultural past. The house was listed on the National Register of Historic Places in 1989.

== Description and history ==
The Henry E. Durfee Farmhouse is located south of downtown Southbridge, in a rural-residential area at the northeast corner of Eastford and Durfee Roads. Its basic plan is a 1 1/2-story three bay side hall configuration; the front facade has significant Greek Revival detailing, including corner pilasters and a recessed doorway with corniced lintel as well as transom and sidelight windows. There is a major addition on the left facade, extending two full stories. The ell extending to the rear has a large gabled dormer with similar features, and a shed-roof porch across its south side.

The house is, despite its now somewhat suburban setting, a reminder of the rural past of that portion of southern Southbridge. Construction of the house is estimated to have been in 1849, around the time of Henry Durfee's marriage; the house was built on land that probably belonged to his mother's family. Its property was once much larger (over 100 acres (40 ha)), but has been reduced over the following years to now occupy less than one acre. The area was basically agrarian until the early 20th century.

== See also ==
- National Register of Historic Places listings in Southbridge, Massachusetts
- National Register of Historic Places listings in Worcester County, Massachusetts
