= Edmund Durfee =

Later-Day Saint martyr

- Born: October 3, 1788; Tiverton, Rhode Island, U.S.
- Died: November 15, 1845 (aged 57); Hancock County, Illinois, U.S.
- Known for: Murdered by Anti-Mormon mob

Edmund Durfee (Durfy) Sr. (October 3, 1788 – November 15, 1845) was an American settler and early member of the Latter Day Saint movement who is remembered as a martyr by Latter-day Saints.

== Biography ==
Born in Tiverton, Rhode Island, Durfee was a farmer, carpenter, and millwright. He married Magdalena Pickle, and they later became the parents of thirteen children. The Durfees joined the Church of Jesus Christ of Latter Day Saints in the 1830s in Ohio. After being driven as religious refugees from Mormon settlements in Ohio and Missouri (see Missouri Executive Order 44), they moved to Morley's Settlement in Hancock County, Illinois, about 25 miles due south of Nauvoo, Illinois.

In September 1845, a mob of anti-Mormon arsonists rushed upon Morley's Settlement. They burned down the Durfee home and, shortly thereafter, burned down the homes of dozens of other Mormon families. The morning following, Solomon Hancock sent word of the burnings to President Brigham Young in Nauvoo:

"Dear Brother,

I will agreeably to your request send you some of the particulars of what has been done. On the other side of the branch, it is a scene of desolation. On Wednesday the 10th all of a sudden, the mob rushed upon Edmund Durfee and destroyed some property, and set fire to both of his buildings. . . On the morning of the 11th they again set fire to the buildings of Edmund Durfee, and fired upon some of his children without hitting them; they then proceeded to the old shop of Father Morley's and set fire to both his shops. In the afternoon the mob came on again and set fire to Father Whiting's chair shop, Walter Cox, Cheney Whiting, and Azariah Tuttle's houses. At evening they retreated back again. . . Last evening they set on fire three buildings, near Esq. Walker's; and this morning we expect them to renew their work of destruction . . . The mob is determined to destroy us.

The mob have burned all houses on the south side of the branch, and left last evening for Lima; said they would return this morning as soon as light, and swear they will sweep through and burn everything in Nauvoo."

== Death ==
After losing their home to the arsonists, the Durfees, with other homeless residents, fled to Nauvoo for safety. Edmund and other men returned to Morley's Settlement to harvest their crops on November 15, 1845. They lodged with Solomon Hancock in his unburned home about one-half mile northeast of Lima, Illinois. Late that evening, nightriders set fire to hay in the Hancock barnyard. Awakened, the Mormon men rushed outside to fight the fire. Edmund Durfee, who was age 57 at the time, was shot in the back and killed. Durfee's attackers were identified and arrested, but never brought to trial, even though "their guilt was sufficiently apparent," according to Illinois Governor Thomas Ford. Edmund was buried near his brother, James Durfee, in Nauvoo's Parley Street Cemetery.

Durfee has since been described as "one of the most inoffensive men in the country." "Some of the mob engaged in the tragic affair afterwards boasted that they had shot Durfee in order to win a wager of a gallon of whisky, that the stack had been set on fire to cause an alarm and draw the men out, and that by killing him they had won the whisky."

Following his murder, Edmund's family participated in the Latter-day Saints' forced exodus from Nauvoo in 1846. Edmund's widow, Magdalena, died during the hard journey near present-day Council Bluffs. His daughter, Tamma Durfee Miner, buried both her baby, Melissa, at Montrose, and her husband Albert Miner, in Iowaville, along the Mormon Trail. Eight Durfee children – Martha Durfee Stevens, Tamma Durfee Miner Curtis, Dolly Durfee Garner, Delana Durfee Dudley, Abraham Durfee, Jabez Durfee, Mary Durfee Carter, and Nephi Durfee – went west with the Latter-day Saints and settled in Utah Territory.
