= Frederick Augustus de Zeng =

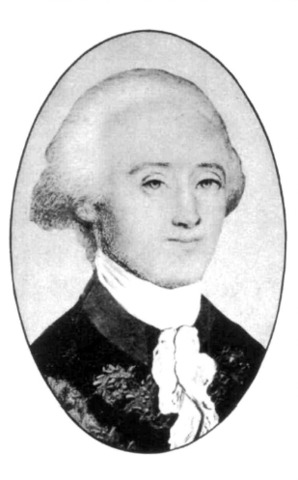
- Born: 1756; Saxony
- Died: April 26, 1838 (aged 81–82); Clyde, New York, United States
- Service: Hessian
- Battles / wars: American Revolutionary War

Baron Frederick Augustus de Zeng (1756 – April 26, 1838) was a military officer and businessman.

Frederick Augustus de Zeng was born in 1756 to Friedrich Caspar von Zenge and Johanna Philippina von Ponickau. He was a member of the family line from Hallungen in Thuringia.

As a Hessian mercenary, he served with a British regiment in the Thirteen Colonies during the American Revolution. He remained after the fighting was over, was naturalized, and pursued various businesses.

== Biography ==
Coat of Arms of Baron Frederick Augustus de Zeng

De Zeng received a military education, and at the age of 18, he became lieutenant of the guard in the service of the Landgraviate of Hesse-Kassel. He saw service in Moravia and Bohemia, and in 1776 received the court appointment of gentleman of the chamber. He went to the Thirteen Colonies about the close of 1780 as captain of one of the Hessian regiments in the British service. He was honorably discharged from the German service in 1783, and in 1784 married and purchased an estate at Red Hook, New York. He was naturalized in 1789, and in 1792, was commissioned major of a militia battalion in Ulster County, in which county he had become joint owner with Chancellor Livingston of a large tract of land. He was intimate with Governor DeWitt Clinton, as both were interested in the opening of the interior water communications of the state, and personally surveyed in 1790–92 the entire countryside from Albany to the Genesee River.

De Zeng was associated with General Philip Schuyler in the Western Inland Lock Navigation Company, and in 1796, was one of three who established a window glass factory near Albany, the first in the state. The enterprise proved a financial success until 1815, when it closed due to a shortage of fuel in the neighborhood. In 1812, he suggested measures that resulted in the improvement of the navigation of Seneca River and its associated lakes, and in 1814–15 began what ultimately became the Chemung Canal. He resided at Kingston in Ulster County and later at Bainbridge in Chenango County, where he built and owned the bridge over the Susquehanna River.
