= Durfee square =

Integer partition attribute, in number theory

In number theory, a Durfee square is an attribute of an integer partition. A partition of n has a Durfee square of size s if s is the largest number such that the partition contains at least s parts with values ≥ s. An equivalent, but more visual, definition is that the Durfee square is the largest square that is contained within a partition's Ferrers diagram. The side-length of the Durfee square is known as the rank of the partition.

The Durfee symbol consists of the two partitions represented by the points to the right or below the Durfee square.

== Examples ==
The partition 4 + 3 + 3 + 2 + 1 + 1:

has a Durfee square of side 3 (in red) because it contains 3 parts that are ≥ 3, but does not contain 4 parts that are ≥ 4. Its Durfee symbol consists of the 2 partitions 1 and 2+1+1.

== History ==
Durfee squares are named after William Pitt Durfee, a student of English mathematician James Joseph Sylvester. In a letter to Arthur Cayley in 1883, Sylvester wrote:

"Durfee's square is a great invention of the importance of which its author has no conception."

== Generating function ==
The Durfee square method leads to this generating function for the integer partitions:

$$P(x) = \sum_{k=0}^\infty \frac{x^{k^2}}{\prod_{i=1}^k (1-x^i)^2}$$

where $x^{k^2}$ is the size of the Durfee square, and $(1-x^i)^2$ represents the two sections to the right and below a Durfee square of size k (being two partitions into parts of size at most k, equivalently partitions with at most k parts).

== Properties ==
It is clear from the visual definition that the Durfee square of a partition and its conjugate partition have the same size. The partitions of an integer n contain Durfee squares with sides up to and including $\lfloor \sqrt{n} \rfloor$.

== See also ==
- h-index
- Jacobi triple product
